

376001–376100 

|-bgcolor=#E9E9E9
| 376001 ||  || — || January 4, 2010 || Kitt Peak || Spacewatch || — || align=right | 2.6 km || 
|-id=002 bgcolor=#E9E9E9
| 376002 ||  || — || January 6, 2010 || Kitt Peak || Spacewatch || GEF || align=right | 1.4 km || 
|-id=003 bgcolor=#d6d6d6
| 376003 ||  || — || January 7, 2010 || Kitt Peak || Spacewatch || — || align=right | 3.1 km || 
|-id=004 bgcolor=#E9E9E9
| 376004 ||  || — || January 6, 2010 || Catalina || CSS || — || align=right | 2.4 km || 
|-id=005 bgcolor=#d6d6d6
| 376005 ||  || — || January 6, 2010 || Kitt Peak || Spacewatch || — || align=right | 2.0 km || 
|-id=006 bgcolor=#d6d6d6
| 376006 ||  || — || January 6, 2010 || Kitt Peak || Spacewatch || — || align=right | 3.0 km || 
|-id=007 bgcolor=#E9E9E9
| 376007 ||  || — || September 6, 2008 || Mount Lemmon || Mount Lemmon Survey || — || align=right | 2.2 km || 
|-id=008 bgcolor=#d6d6d6
| 376008 ||  || — || January 7, 2010 || Kitt Peak || Spacewatch || — || align=right | 2.7 km || 
|-id=009 bgcolor=#d6d6d6
| 376009 ||  || — || January 7, 2010 || Kitt Peak || Spacewatch || — || align=right | 5.2 km || 
|-id=010 bgcolor=#d6d6d6
| 376010 ||  || — || January 7, 2010 || Kitt Peak || Spacewatch || — || align=right | 2.6 km || 
|-id=011 bgcolor=#d6d6d6
| 376011 ||  || — || January 9, 2010 || Nazaret || G. Muler || — || align=right | 3.4 km || 
|-id=012 bgcolor=#E9E9E9
| 376012 ||  || — || January 12, 2010 || Bisei SG Center || BATTeRS || — || align=right | 2.5 km || 
|-id=013 bgcolor=#E9E9E9
| 376013 ||  || — || January 6, 2010 || Kitt Peak || Spacewatch || — || align=right | 2.9 km || 
|-id=014 bgcolor=#E9E9E9
| 376014 ||  || — || November 21, 2009 || Mount Lemmon || Mount Lemmon Survey || NEM || align=right | 2.5 km || 
|-id=015 bgcolor=#E9E9E9
| 376015 ||  || — || January 8, 2010 || Kitt Peak || Spacewatch || — || align=right | 1.4 km || 
|-id=016 bgcolor=#d6d6d6
| 376016 ||  || — || January 10, 2010 || Kitt Peak || Spacewatch || — || align=right | 4.1 km || 
|-id=017 bgcolor=#E9E9E9
| 376017 ||  || — || January 12, 2010 || Kitt Peak || Spacewatch || — || align=right | 2.7 km || 
|-id=018 bgcolor=#E9E9E9
| 376018 ||  || — || January 12, 2010 || Mount Lemmon || Mount Lemmon Survey || — || align=right data-sort-value="0.71" | 710 m || 
|-id=019 bgcolor=#d6d6d6
| 376019 ||  || — || January 12, 2010 || Mount Lemmon || Mount Lemmon Survey || — || align=right | 3.2 km || 
|-id=020 bgcolor=#E9E9E9
| 376020 ||  || — || January 12, 2010 || Kitt Peak || Spacewatch || — || align=right | 2.8 km || 
|-id=021 bgcolor=#E9E9E9
| 376021 ||  || — || November 4, 2004 || Anderson Mesa || LONEOS || DOR || align=right | 3.2 km || 
|-id=022 bgcolor=#d6d6d6
| 376022 ||  || — || January 6, 2010 || Kitt Peak || Spacewatch || TIR || align=right | 3.4 km || 
|-id=023 bgcolor=#d6d6d6
| 376023 ||  || — || January 7, 2010 || Kitt Peak || Spacewatch || EOS || align=right | 2.3 km || 
|-id=024 bgcolor=#d6d6d6
| 376024 ||  || — || January 8, 2010 || WISE || WISE || — || align=right | 4.5 km || 
|-id=025 bgcolor=#E9E9E9
| 376025 ||  || — || January 17, 2010 || Dauban || F. Kugel || HOF || align=right | 2.8 km || 
|-id=026 bgcolor=#d6d6d6
| 376026 ||  || — || January 19, 2010 || WISE || WISE || LIX || align=right | 4.7 km || 
|-id=027 bgcolor=#d6d6d6
| 376027 ||  || — || January 11, 2010 || Kitt Peak || Spacewatch || — || align=right | 2.9 km || 
|-id=028 bgcolor=#d6d6d6
| 376028 ||  || — || February 6, 2010 || Mayhill || A. Lowe || EOS || align=right | 2.5 km || 
|-id=029 bgcolor=#d6d6d6
| 376029 Blahová ||  ||  || February 12, 2010 || Mayhill || S. Kürti || THB || align=right | 3.9 km || 
|-id=030 bgcolor=#d6d6d6
| 376030 ||  || — || February 6, 2010 || La Sagra || OAM Obs. || — || align=right | 2.8 km || 
|-id=031 bgcolor=#d6d6d6
| 376031 ||  || — || February 9, 2010 || Catalina || CSS || — || align=right | 2.4 km || 
|-id=032 bgcolor=#d6d6d6
| 376032 ||  || — || February 10, 2010 || Kitt Peak || Spacewatch || — || align=right | 3.6 km || 
|-id=033 bgcolor=#d6d6d6
| 376033 ||  || — || February 13, 2010 || WISE || WISE || — || align=right | 6.0 km || 
|-id=034 bgcolor=#d6d6d6
| 376034 ||  || — || February 14, 2010 || Socorro || LINEAR || — || align=right | 4.4 km || 
|-id=035 bgcolor=#d6d6d6
| 376035 ||  || — || December 29, 1997 || Kitt Peak || Spacewatch || — || align=right | 3.5 km || 
|-id=036 bgcolor=#d6d6d6
| 376036 ||  || — || December 22, 1998 || Kitt Peak || Spacewatch || — || align=right | 3.4 km || 
|-id=037 bgcolor=#d6d6d6
| 376037 ||  || — || August 23, 2007 || Kitt Peak || Spacewatch || — || align=right | 3.7 km || 
|-id=038 bgcolor=#d6d6d6
| 376038 ||  || — || October 31, 2008 || Catalina || CSS || EOS || align=right | 2.0 km || 
|-id=039 bgcolor=#d6d6d6
| 376039 ||  || — || February 9, 2010 || Catalina || CSS || — || align=right | 2.5 km || 
|-id=040 bgcolor=#d6d6d6
| 376040 ||  || — || November 18, 2008 || Catalina || CSS || EOS || align=right | 2.0 km || 
|-id=041 bgcolor=#d6d6d6
| 376041 ||  || — || February 14, 2010 || Catalina || CSS || — || align=right | 3.7 km || 
|-id=042 bgcolor=#d6d6d6
| 376042 ||  || — || February 15, 2010 || Catalina || CSS || — || align=right | 2.5 km || 
|-id=043 bgcolor=#d6d6d6
| 376043 ||  || — || October 4, 2007 || Mount Lemmon || Mount Lemmon Survey || — || align=right | 4.6 km || 
|-id=044 bgcolor=#d6d6d6
| 376044 ||  || — || January 11, 2010 || Mount Lemmon || Mount Lemmon Survey || — || align=right | 4.6 km || 
|-id=045 bgcolor=#d6d6d6
| 376045 ||  || — || February 14, 2010 || Kitt Peak || Spacewatch || EOS || align=right | 2.8 km || 
|-id=046 bgcolor=#d6d6d6
| 376046 ||  || — || August 10, 2007 || Kitt Peak || Spacewatch || — || align=right | 3.4 km || 
|-id=047 bgcolor=#d6d6d6
| 376047 ||  || — || February 16, 2010 || Mount Lemmon || Mount Lemmon Survey || — || align=right | 4.1 km || 
|-id=048 bgcolor=#d6d6d6
| 376048 ||  || — || February 18, 2010 || WISE || WISE || — || align=right | 4.8 km || 
|-id=049 bgcolor=#d6d6d6
| 376049 ||  || — || February 16, 2010 || Kitt Peak || Spacewatch || — || align=right | 3.6 km || 
|-id=050 bgcolor=#d6d6d6
| 376050 ||  || — || January 15, 2004 || Kitt Peak || Spacewatch || THM || align=right | 1.9 km || 
|-id=051 bgcolor=#d6d6d6
| 376051 ||  || — || March 9, 2010 || Bergisch Gladbach || W. Bickel || — || align=right | 4.5 km || 
|-id=052 bgcolor=#d6d6d6
| 376052 ||  || — || March 13, 2010 || Črni Vrh || Črni Vrh || — || align=right | 5.1 km || 
|-id=053 bgcolor=#d6d6d6
| 376053 ||  || — || March 12, 2010 || Mount Lemmon || Mount Lemmon Survey || — || align=right | 3.2 km || 
|-id=054 bgcolor=#d6d6d6
| 376054 ||  || — || March 14, 2010 || Kitt Peak || Spacewatch || — || align=right | 5.5 km || 
|-id=055 bgcolor=#d6d6d6
| 376055 ||  || — || March 4, 2010 || Catalina || CSS || EOS || align=right | 4.5 km || 
|-id=056 bgcolor=#d6d6d6
| 376056 ||  || — || March 15, 2010 || Mount Lemmon || Mount Lemmon Survey || — || align=right | 3.6 km || 
|-id=057 bgcolor=#E9E9E9
| 376057 ||  || — || March 8, 2010 || WISE || WISE || — || align=right | 2.4 km || 
|-id=058 bgcolor=#E9E9E9
| 376058 ||  || — || March 16, 2010 || WISE || WISE || HOF || align=right | 3.0 km || 
|-id=059 bgcolor=#d6d6d6
| 376059 ||  || — || March 17, 2010 || Catalina || CSS || slow || align=right | 5.8 km || 
|-id=060 bgcolor=#d6d6d6
| 376060 ||  || — || November 17, 2008 || Kitt Peak || Spacewatch || THM || align=right | 2.1 km || 
|-id=061 bgcolor=#d6d6d6
| 376061 ||  || — || January 13, 2004 || Kitt Peak || Spacewatch || — || align=right | 5.9 km || 
|-id=062 bgcolor=#d6d6d6
| 376062 ||  || — || January 20, 2009 || Catalina || CSS || 3:2 || align=right | 8.3 km || 
|-id=063 bgcolor=#d6d6d6
| 376063 ||  || — || November 7, 2002 || Socorro || LINEAR || THM || align=right | 3.0 km || 
|-id=064 bgcolor=#d6d6d6
| 376064 ||  || — || April 9, 2010 || Mount Lemmon || Mount Lemmon Survey || LIX || align=right | 3.6 km || 
|-id=065 bgcolor=#d6d6d6
| 376065 ||  || — || April 12, 2010 || Mount Lemmon || Mount Lemmon Survey || — || align=right | 4.3 km || 
|-id=066 bgcolor=#d6d6d6
| 376066 ||  || — || April 6, 2010 || Catalina || CSS || — || align=right | 3.5 km || 
|-id=067 bgcolor=#C2FFFF
| 376067 ||  || — || December 13, 2004 || Kitt Peak || Spacewatch || L5 || align=right | 15 km || 
|-id=068 bgcolor=#d6d6d6
| 376068 ||  || — || December 29, 2003 || Catalina || CSS || — || align=right | 5.3 km || 
|-id=069 bgcolor=#d6d6d6
| 376069 ||  || — || June 11, 2010 || Mount Lemmon || Mount Lemmon Survey || — || align=right | 4.1 km || 
|-id=070 bgcolor=#FA8072
| 376070 ||  || — || October 10, 2007 || Kitt Peak || Spacewatch || — || align=right data-sort-value="0.65" | 650 m || 
|-id=071 bgcolor=#E9E9E9
| 376071 ||  || — || July 22, 2010 || WISE || WISE || — || align=right | 2.4 km || 
|-id=072 bgcolor=#fefefe
| 376072 ||  || — || October 12, 2010 || Mount Lemmon || Mount Lemmon Survey || FLO || align=right data-sort-value="0.52" | 520 m || 
|-id=073 bgcolor=#d6d6d6
| 376073 ||  || — || October 4, 1999 || Kitt Peak || Spacewatch || THM || align=right | 2.0 km || 
|-id=074 bgcolor=#fefefe
| 376074 ||  || — || November 5, 2007 || Kitt Peak || Spacewatch || — || align=right data-sort-value="0.79" | 790 m || 
|-id=075 bgcolor=#fefefe
| 376075 ||  || — || May 1, 2009 || Mount Lemmon || Mount Lemmon Survey || — || align=right data-sort-value="0.74" | 740 m || 
|-id=076 bgcolor=#fefefe
| 376076 ||  || — || October 29, 2010 || Mount Lemmon || Mount Lemmon Survey || V || align=right data-sort-value="0.58" | 580 m || 
|-id=077 bgcolor=#fefefe
| 376077 ||  || — || September 5, 2010 || Mount Lemmon || Mount Lemmon Survey || — || align=right data-sort-value="0.89" | 890 m || 
|-id=078 bgcolor=#fefefe
| 376078 ||  || — || December 20, 2004 || Mount Lemmon || Mount Lemmon Survey || FLO || align=right data-sort-value="0.74" | 740 m || 
|-id=079 bgcolor=#fefefe
| 376079 ||  || — || December 13, 2007 || Socorro || LINEAR || — || align=right data-sort-value="0.93" | 930 m || 
|-id=080 bgcolor=#fefefe
| 376080 ||  || — || September 18, 2003 || Kitt Peak || Spacewatch || FLO || align=right data-sort-value="0.57" | 570 m || 
|-id=081 bgcolor=#fefefe
| 376081 ||  || — || September 16, 2010 || Kitt Peak || Spacewatch || FLO || align=right data-sort-value="0.50" | 500 m || 
|-id=082 bgcolor=#fefefe
| 376082 ||  || — || November 9, 2007 || Mount Lemmon || Mount Lemmon Survey || — || align=right data-sort-value="0.68" | 680 m || 
|-id=083 bgcolor=#fefefe
| 376083 ||  || — || December 5, 2007 || Kitt Peak || Spacewatch || FLO || align=right data-sort-value="0.53" | 530 m || 
|-id=084 bgcolor=#fefefe
| 376084 Annettepeter ||  ||  || November 3, 2010 || Tzec Maun || E. Schwab || FLO || align=right data-sort-value="0.76" | 760 m || 
|-id=085 bgcolor=#fefefe
| 376085 ||  || — || November 2, 2010 || Kitt Peak || Spacewatch || — || align=right data-sort-value="0.65" | 650 m || 
|-id=086 bgcolor=#fefefe
| 376086 ||  || — || November 3, 2010 || Mount Lemmon || Mount Lemmon Survey || — || align=right data-sort-value="0.83" | 830 m || 
|-id=087 bgcolor=#fefefe
| 376087 ||  || — || April 14, 2005 || Kitt Peak || Spacewatch || — || align=right data-sort-value="0.96" | 960 m || 
|-id=088 bgcolor=#fefefe
| 376088 ||  || — || November 7, 2007 || Mount Lemmon || Mount Lemmon Survey || — || align=right data-sort-value="0.85" | 850 m || 
|-id=089 bgcolor=#fefefe
| 376089 ||  || — || April 24, 2006 || Kitt Peak || Spacewatch || — || align=right data-sort-value="0.60" | 600 m || 
|-id=090 bgcolor=#fefefe
| 376090 ||  || — || December 16, 2007 || Kitt Peak || Spacewatch || — || align=right data-sort-value="0.85" | 850 m || 
|-id=091 bgcolor=#fefefe
| 376091 ||  || — || September 18, 2010 || Mount Lemmon || Mount Lemmon Survey || FLO || align=right data-sort-value="0.52" | 520 m || 
|-id=092 bgcolor=#fefefe
| 376092 ||  || — || January 10, 2008 || Kitt Peak || Spacewatch || — || align=right data-sort-value="0.62" | 620 m || 
|-id=093 bgcolor=#fefefe
| 376093 ||  || — || February 5, 2009 || Mount Lemmon || Mount Lemmon Survey || — || align=right data-sort-value="0.92" | 920 m || 
|-id=094 bgcolor=#fefefe
| 376094 ||  || — || December 17, 2007 || Kitt Peak || Spacewatch || — || align=right data-sort-value="0.68" | 680 m || 
|-id=095 bgcolor=#fefefe
| 376095 ||  || — || December 15, 2007 || Kitt Peak || Spacewatch || — || align=right data-sort-value="0.57" | 570 m || 
|-id=096 bgcolor=#fefefe
| 376096 ||  || — || December 1, 2003 || Kitt Peak || Spacewatch || — || align=right data-sort-value="0.80" | 800 m || 
|-id=097 bgcolor=#fefefe
| 376097 ||  || — || October 20, 2003 || Kitt Peak || Spacewatch || — || align=right data-sort-value="0.70" | 700 m || 
|-id=098 bgcolor=#fefefe
| 376098 ||  || — || March 24, 2002 || Kitt Peak || Spacewatch || — || align=right data-sort-value="0.81" | 810 m || 
|-id=099 bgcolor=#fefefe
| 376099 ||  || — || November 1, 2010 || Kitt Peak || Spacewatch || — || align=right | 1.0 km || 
|-id=100 bgcolor=#fefefe
| 376100 ||  || — || November 4, 2010 || La Sagra || OAM Obs. || — || align=right data-sort-value="0.73" | 730 m || 
|}

376101–376200 

|-bgcolor=#fefefe
| 376101 ||  || — || September 18, 2003 || Kitt Peak || Spacewatch || — || align=right data-sort-value="0.86" | 860 m || 
|-id=102 bgcolor=#fefefe
| 376102 ||  || — || December 14, 2003 || Kitt Peak || Spacewatch || — || align=right data-sort-value="0.89" | 890 m || 
|-id=103 bgcolor=#fefefe
| 376103 ||  || — || December 30, 2007 || Mount Lemmon || Mount Lemmon Survey || FLO || align=right data-sort-value="0.56" | 560 m || 
|-id=104 bgcolor=#fefefe
| 376104 ||  || — || November 28, 2010 || Kitt Peak || Spacewatch || FLO || align=right data-sort-value="0.66" | 660 m || 
|-id=105 bgcolor=#fefefe
| 376105 ||  || — || November 19, 2003 || Anderson Mesa || LONEOS || — || align=right data-sort-value="0.59" | 590 m || 
|-id=106 bgcolor=#fefefe
| 376106 ||  || — || November 11, 2007 || Mount Lemmon || Mount Lemmon Survey || — || align=right data-sort-value="0.61" | 610 m || 
|-id=107 bgcolor=#fefefe
| 376107 ||  || — || March 3, 2008 || Catalina || CSS || — || align=right data-sort-value="0.91" | 910 m || 
|-id=108 bgcolor=#fefefe
| 376108 ||  || — || January 18, 2008 || Mount Lemmon || Mount Lemmon Survey || — || align=right data-sort-value="0.75" | 750 m || 
|-id=109 bgcolor=#fefefe
| 376109 ||  || — || March 8, 2008 || Kitt Peak || Spacewatch || — || align=right data-sort-value="0.67" | 670 m || 
|-id=110 bgcolor=#fefefe
| 376110 ||  || — || October 19, 2000 || Kitt Peak || Spacewatch || — || align=right data-sort-value="0.73" | 730 m || 
|-id=111 bgcolor=#fefefe
| 376111 ||  || — || November 4, 2002 || La Palma || A. Fitzsimmons || MAS || align=right data-sort-value="0.80" | 800 m || 
|-id=112 bgcolor=#fefefe
| 376112 ||  || — || April 21, 2009 || Mount Lemmon || Mount Lemmon Survey || FLO || align=right data-sort-value="0.58" | 580 m || 
|-id=113 bgcolor=#fefefe
| 376113 ||  || — || October 17, 2003 || Kitt Peak || Spacewatch || — || align=right data-sort-value="0.64" | 640 m || 
|-id=114 bgcolor=#fefefe
| 376114 ||  || — || October 16, 2003 || Kitt Peak || Spacewatch || — || align=right data-sort-value="0.66" | 660 m || 
|-id=115 bgcolor=#fefefe
| 376115 ||  || — || February 7, 2002 || Kitt Peak || Spacewatch || — || align=right data-sort-value="0.70" | 700 m || 
|-id=116 bgcolor=#fefefe
| 376116 ||  || — || November 2, 2010 || Mount Lemmon || Mount Lemmon Survey || — || align=right data-sort-value="0.75" | 750 m || 
|-id=117 bgcolor=#fefefe
| 376117 ||  || — || December 5, 2010 || Mount Lemmon || Mount Lemmon Survey || — || align=right data-sort-value="0.79" | 790 m || 
|-id=118 bgcolor=#fefefe
| 376118 ||  || — || December 6, 2010 || Kitt Peak || Spacewatch || — || align=right data-sort-value="0.86" | 860 m || 
|-id=119 bgcolor=#fefefe
| 376119 ||  || — || October 20, 2003 || Kitt Peak || Spacewatch || — || align=right data-sort-value="0.62" | 620 m || 
|-id=120 bgcolor=#fefefe
| 376120 ||  || — || October 19, 2006 || Kitt Peak || Spacewatch || ERI || align=right | 1.7 km || 
|-id=121 bgcolor=#fefefe
| 376121 ||  || — || January 5, 2011 || Catalina || CSS || — || align=right | 1.4 km || 
|-id=122 bgcolor=#fefefe
| 376122 ||  || — || March 20, 2004 || Socorro || LINEAR || V || align=right data-sort-value="0.90" | 900 m || 
|-id=123 bgcolor=#fefefe
| 376123 ||  || — || January 13, 2004 || Kitt Peak || Spacewatch || — || align=right data-sort-value="0.62" | 620 m || 
|-id=124 bgcolor=#fefefe
| 376124 ||  || — || February 6, 2000 || Catalina || CSS || NYS || align=right data-sort-value="0.82" | 820 m || 
|-id=125 bgcolor=#fefefe
| 376125 ||  || — || November 16, 2010 || Mount Lemmon || Mount Lemmon Survey || — || align=right | 1.5 km || 
|-id=126 bgcolor=#E9E9E9
| 376126 ||  || — || December 13, 2001 || Socorro || LINEAR || — || align=right | 1.8 km || 
|-id=127 bgcolor=#fefefe
| 376127 ||  || — || December 24, 2006 || Kitt Peak || Spacewatch || MAS || align=right data-sort-value="0.83" | 830 m || 
|-id=128 bgcolor=#fefefe
| 376128 ||  || — || December 13, 2006 || Kitt Peak || Spacewatch || MAS || align=right data-sort-value="0.68" | 680 m || 
|-id=129 bgcolor=#E9E9E9
| 376129 ||  || — || December 10, 2005 || Kitt Peak || Spacewatch || DOR || align=right | 2.7 km || 
|-id=130 bgcolor=#E9E9E9
| 376130 ||  || — || July 2, 2008 || Kitt Peak || Spacewatch || — || align=right | 2.0 km || 
|-id=131 bgcolor=#fefefe
| 376131 ||  || — || November 22, 2006 || Kitt Peak || Spacewatch || CLA || align=right | 1.6 km || 
|-id=132 bgcolor=#fefefe
| 376132 ||  || — || September 19, 1998 || Caussols || ODAS || — || align=right | 1.0 km || 
|-id=133 bgcolor=#fefefe
| 376133 ||  || — || November 2, 2006 || Mount Lemmon || Mount Lemmon Survey || — || align=right data-sort-value="0.92" | 920 m || 
|-id=134 bgcolor=#E9E9E9
| 376134 ||  || — || March 20, 2007 || Catalina || CSS || — || align=right | 2.2 km || 
|-id=135 bgcolor=#fefefe
| 376135 ||  || — || October 11, 1996 || Kitt Peak || Spacewatch || — || align=right data-sort-value="0.62" | 620 m || 
|-id=136 bgcolor=#fefefe
| 376136 ||  || — || November 14, 1998 || Kitt Peak || Spacewatch || — || align=right data-sort-value="0.76" | 760 m || 
|-id=137 bgcolor=#fefefe
| 376137 ||  || — || May 27, 2008 || Kitt Peak || Spacewatch || — || align=right data-sort-value="0.90" | 900 m || 
|-id=138 bgcolor=#E9E9E9
| 376138 ||  || — || February 9, 2007 || Catalina || CSS || — || align=right | 1.8 km || 
|-id=139 bgcolor=#E9E9E9
| 376139 ||  || — || February 13, 2007 || Mount Lemmon || Mount Lemmon Survey || — || align=right | 1.6 km || 
|-id=140 bgcolor=#fefefe
| 376140 ||  || — || March 28, 2008 || Mount Lemmon || Mount Lemmon Survey || NYS || align=right data-sort-value="0.77" | 770 m || 
|-id=141 bgcolor=#fefefe
| 376141 ||  || — || August 19, 2006 || Kitt Peak || Spacewatch || — || align=right data-sort-value="0.63" | 630 m || 
|-id=142 bgcolor=#fefefe
| 376142 ||  || — || January 29, 2000 || Kitt Peak || Spacewatch || MAS || align=right data-sort-value="0.65" | 650 m || 
|-id=143 bgcolor=#E9E9E9
| 376143 ||  || — || March 14, 2007 || Anderson Mesa || LONEOS || MAR || align=right | 1.5 km || 
|-id=144 bgcolor=#d6d6d6
| 376144 ||  || — || August 7, 2008 || Kitt Peak || Spacewatch || BRA || align=right | 1.5 km || 
|-id=145 bgcolor=#E9E9E9
| 376145 ||  || — || September 22, 2009 || Mount Lemmon || Mount Lemmon Survey || NEM || align=right | 2.2 km || 
|-id=146 bgcolor=#E9E9E9
| 376146 ||  || — || March 12, 2007 || Kitt Peak || Spacewatch || — || align=right | 1.9 km || 
|-id=147 bgcolor=#d6d6d6
| 376147 ||  || — || January 23, 2006 || Mount Lemmon || Mount Lemmon Survey || — || align=right | 2.8 km || 
|-id=148 bgcolor=#fefefe
| 376148 ||  || — || December 13, 2006 || Mount Lemmon || Mount Lemmon Survey || — || align=right | 1.1 km || 
|-id=149 bgcolor=#fefefe
| 376149 ||  || — || September 26, 2006 || Mount Lemmon || Mount Lemmon Survey || — || align=right data-sort-value="0.64" | 640 m || 
|-id=150 bgcolor=#fefefe
| 376150 ||  || — || March 21, 2004 || Kitt Peak || Spacewatch || — || align=right data-sort-value="0.95" | 950 m || 
|-id=151 bgcolor=#E9E9E9
| 376151 ||  || — || November 30, 2005 || Kitt Peak || Spacewatch || — || align=right | 2.2 km || 
|-id=152 bgcolor=#E9E9E9
| 376152 ||  || — || March 14, 2007 || Kitt Peak || Spacewatch || — || align=right | 1.9 km || 
|-id=153 bgcolor=#E9E9E9
| 376153 ||  || — || January 17, 2007 || Kitt Peak || Spacewatch || — || align=right data-sort-value="0.75" | 750 m || 
|-id=154 bgcolor=#fefefe
| 376154 ||  || — || March 16, 2004 || Kitt Peak || Spacewatch || — || align=right data-sort-value="0.57" | 570 m || 
|-id=155 bgcolor=#E9E9E9
| 376155 ||  || — || August 11, 2004 || Socorro || LINEAR || — || align=right | 2.2 km || 
|-id=156 bgcolor=#fefefe
| 376156 ||  || — || November 19, 2006 || Catalina || CSS || — || align=right data-sort-value="0.94" | 940 m || 
|-id=157 bgcolor=#fefefe
| 376157 ||  || — || December 27, 2006 || Mount Lemmon || Mount Lemmon Survey || — || align=right data-sort-value="0.92" | 920 m || 
|-id=158 bgcolor=#fefefe
| 376158 ||  || — || July 1, 1997 || Kitt Peak || Spacewatch || — || align=right | 1.0 km || 
|-id=159 bgcolor=#E9E9E9
| 376159 ||  || — || August 27, 2009 || Kitt Peak || Spacewatch || — || align=right data-sort-value="0.76" | 760 m || 
|-id=160 bgcolor=#E9E9E9
| 376160 ||  || — || December 1, 2005 || Kitt Peak || Spacewatch || — || align=right | 2.7 km || 
|-id=161 bgcolor=#E9E9E9
| 376161 ||  || — || October 27, 2009 || Kitt Peak || Spacewatch || — || align=right | 2.1 km || 
|-id=162 bgcolor=#fefefe
| 376162 ||  || — || August 31, 2005 || Kitt Peak || Spacewatch || — || align=right data-sort-value="0.93" | 930 m || 
|-id=163 bgcolor=#E9E9E9
| 376163 ||  || — || January 27, 2007 || Kitt Peak || Spacewatch || — || align=right | 2.2 km || 
|-id=164 bgcolor=#E9E9E9
| 376164 ||  || — || January 27, 2011 || Mount Lemmon || Mount Lemmon Survey || — || align=right | 1.4 km || 
|-id=165 bgcolor=#E9E9E9
| 376165 ||  || — || January 28, 2011 || Mount Lemmon || Mount Lemmon Survey || — || align=right | 1.8 km || 
|-id=166 bgcolor=#E9E9E9
| 376166 ||  || — || November 8, 2009 || Mount Lemmon || Mount Lemmon Survey || AGN || align=right | 1.3 km || 
|-id=167 bgcolor=#E9E9E9
| 376167 ||  || — || January 14, 2011 || Kitt Peak || Spacewatch || AEO || align=right | 1.1 km || 
|-id=168 bgcolor=#E9E9E9
| 376168 ||  || — || January 10, 2011 || Kitt Peak || Spacewatch || — || align=right | 1.5 km || 
|-id=169 bgcolor=#d6d6d6
| 376169 ||  || — || February 15, 1994 || Kitt Peak || Spacewatch || — || align=right | 6.6 km || 
|-id=170 bgcolor=#d6d6d6
| 376170 ||  || — || December 6, 2005 || Kitt Peak || Spacewatch || — || align=right | 3.3 km || 
|-id=171 bgcolor=#E9E9E9
| 376171 ||  || — || January 28, 2007 || Mount Lemmon || Mount Lemmon Survey || — || align=right | 1.4 km || 
|-id=172 bgcolor=#E9E9E9
| 376172 ||  || — || December 1, 2005 || Kitt Peak || Spacewatch || AST || align=right | 1.9 km || 
|-id=173 bgcolor=#fefefe
| 376173 ||  || — || December 13, 2006 || Kitt Peak || Spacewatch || CLA || align=right | 1.8 km || 
|-id=174 bgcolor=#E9E9E9
| 376174 ||  || — || November 6, 2005 || Kitt Peak || Spacewatch || — || align=right | 1.7 km || 
|-id=175 bgcolor=#E9E9E9
| 376175 ||  || — || January 26, 2007 || Kitt Peak || Spacewatch || — || align=right | 1.1 km || 
|-id=176 bgcolor=#fefefe
| 376176 ||  || — || October 16, 2006 || Catalina || CSS || — || align=right data-sort-value="0.81" | 810 m || 
|-id=177 bgcolor=#fefefe
| 376177 ||  || — || September 27, 2006 || Mount Lemmon || Mount Lemmon Survey || MAS || align=right data-sort-value="0.71" | 710 m || 
|-id=178 bgcolor=#fefefe
| 376178 ||  || — || December 11, 2006 || Kitt Peak || Spacewatch || NYS || align=right data-sort-value="0.89" | 890 m || 
|-id=179 bgcolor=#fefefe
| 376179 ||  || — || December 13, 2006 || Mount Lemmon || Mount Lemmon Survey || NYS || align=right data-sort-value="0.65" | 650 m || 
|-id=180 bgcolor=#E9E9E9
| 376180 ||  || — || September 11, 2004 || Kitt Peak || Spacewatch || — || align=right | 1.8 km || 
|-id=181 bgcolor=#E9E9E9
| 376181 ||  || — || January 25, 2007 || Kitt Peak || Spacewatch || — || align=right data-sort-value="0.88" | 880 m || 
|-id=182 bgcolor=#E9E9E9
| 376182 ||  || — || September 7, 2008 || Mount Lemmon || Mount Lemmon Survey || — || align=right | 1.9 km || 
|-id=183 bgcolor=#E9E9E9
| 376183 ||  || — || February 7, 2002 || Socorro || LINEAR || — || align=right | 3.1 km || 
|-id=184 bgcolor=#E9E9E9
| 376184 ||  || — || July 12, 2005 || Kitt Peak || Spacewatch || — || align=right data-sort-value="0.81" | 810 m || 
|-id=185 bgcolor=#fefefe
| 376185 ||  || — || October 1, 2005 || Catalina || CSS || — || align=right | 1.3 km || 
|-id=186 bgcolor=#E9E9E9
| 376186 ||  || — || March 20, 2007 || Mount Lemmon || Mount Lemmon Survey || — || align=right | 1.6 km || 
|-id=187 bgcolor=#fefefe
| 376187 ||  || — || December 24, 2006 || Kitt Peak || Spacewatch || — || align=right data-sort-value="0.75" | 750 m || 
|-id=188 bgcolor=#d6d6d6
| 376188 ||  || — || February 23, 2006 || Anderson Mesa || LONEOS || EOS || align=right | 2.5 km || 
|-id=189 bgcolor=#E9E9E9
| 376189 ||  || — || May 30, 2008 || Kitt Peak || Spacewatch || — || align=right data-sort-value="0.96" | 960 m || 
|-id=190 bgcolor=#E9E9E9
| 376190 ||  || — || February 1, 2010 || WISE || WISE || — || align=right | 1.4 km || 
|-id=191 bgcolor=#fefefe
| 376191 ||  || — || September 19, 2006 || Kitt Peak || Spacewatch || — || align=right data-sort-value="0.71" | 710 m || 
|-id=192 bgcolor=#fefefe
| 376192 ||  || — || November 17, 2006 || Kitt Peak || Spacewatch || — || align=right data-sort-value="0.81" | 810 m || 
|-id=193 bgcolor=#E9E9E9
| 376193 ||  || — || September 15, 2004 || Kitt Peak || Spacewatch || — || align=right | 1.5 km || 
|-id=194 bgcolor=#E9E9E9
| 376194 ||  || — || September 7, 2004 || Kitt Peak || Spacewatch || JUN || align=right | 1.4 km || 
|-id=195 bgcolor=#fefefe
| 376195 ||  || — || March 31, 2004 || Kitt Peak || Spacewatch || ERI || align=right | 1.7 km || 
|-id=196 bgcolor=#fefefe
| 376196 ||  || — || April 22, 2004 || Kitt Peak || Spacewatch || MAS || align=right | 1.0 km || 
|-id=197 bgcolor=#fefefe
| 376197 ||  || — || May 9, 2004 || Kitt Peak || Spacewatch || — || align=right | 1.1 km || 
|-id=198 bgcolor=#d6d6d6
| 376198 ||  || — || November 27, 2009 || Mount Lemmon || Mount Lemmon Survey || — || align=right | 4.8 km || 
|-id=199 bgcolor=#d6d6d6
| 376199 ||  || — || November 9, 2009 || Kitt Peak || Spacewatch || CHA || align=right | 2.0 km || 
|-id=200 bgcolor=#fefefe
| 376200 ||  || — || January 27, 2007 || Kitt Peak || Spacewatch || MAS || align=right data-sort-value="0.68" | 680 m || 
|}

376201–376300 

|-bgcolor=#E9E9E9
| 376201 ||  || — || April 20, 2007 || Kitt Peak || Spacewatch || NEM || align=right | 2.6 km || 
|-id=202 bgcolor=#fefefe
| 376202 ||  || — || November 11, 2006 || Mount Lemmon || Mount Lemmon Survey || MAS || align=right data-sort-value="0.78" | 780 m || 
|-id=203 bgcolor=#fefefe
| 376203 ||  || — || November 24, 2006 || Kitt Peak || Spacewatch || NYS || align=right data-sort-value="0.64" | 640 m || 
|-id=204 bgcolor=#fefefe
| 376204 ||  || — || November 16, 2006 || Mount Lemmon || Mount Lemmon Survey || MAS || align=right data-sort-value="0.87" | 870 m || 
|-id=205 bgcolor=#E9E9E9
| 376205 ||  || — || January 5, 2006 || Kitt Peak || Spacewatch || — || align=right | 1.6 km || 
|-id=206 bgcolor=#E9E9E9
| 376206 ||  || — || December 26, 2006 || Kitt Peak || Spacewatch || — || align=right data-sort-value="0.99" | 990 m || 
|-id=207 bgcolor=#E9E9E9
| 376207 ||  || — || February 8, 2011 || Mount Lemmon || Mount Lemmon Survey || — || align=right | 1.7 km || 
|-id=208 bgcolor=#E9E9E9
| 376208 ||  || — || January 22, 2002 || Kitt Peak || Spacewatch || — || align=right | 1.3 km || 
|-id=209 bgcolor=#E9E9E9
| 376209 ||  || — || December 25, 2005 || Kitt Peak || Spacewatch || — || align=right | 1.5 km || 
|-id=210 bgcolor=#E9E9E9
| 376210 ||  || — || February 26, 2011 || Kitt Peak || Spacewatch || — || align=right | 1.3 km || 
|-id=211 bgcolor=#E9E9E9
| 376211 ||  || — || January 21, 2002 || Kitt Peak || Spacewatch || — || align=right | 1.8 km || 
|-id=212 bgcolor=#fefefe
| 376212 ||  || — || November 22, 2006 || Kitt Peak || Spacewatch || MAS || align=right data-sort-value="0.74" | 740 m || 
|-id=213 bgcolor=#fefefe
| 376213 ||  || — || December 24, 2006 || Kitt Peak || Spacewatch || — || align=right data-sort-value="0.83" | 830 m || 
|-id=214 bgcolor=#d6d6d6
| 376214 ||  || — || April 24, 2006 || Kitt Peak || Spacewatch || THM || align=right | 2.1 km || 
|-id=215 bgcolor=#fefefe
| 376215 ||  || — || January 15, 1996 || Linz || E. Meyer || NYS || align=right data-sort-value="0.82" | 820 m || 
|-id=216 bgcolor=#d6d6d6
| 376216 ||  || — || February 10, 2011 || Mount Lemmon || Mount Lemmon Survey || — || align=right | 2.6 km || 
|-id=217 bgcolor=#E9E9E9
| 376217 ||  || — || March 1, 2011 || Catalina || CSS || — || align=right | 2.8 km || 
|-id=218 bgcolor=#d6d6d6
| 376218 ||  || — || December 21, 2004 || Catalina || CSS || EOS || align=right | 3.0 km || 
|-id=219 bgcolor=#fefefe
| 376219 ||  || — || April 21, 2004 || Kitt Peak || Spacewatch || NYS || align=right data-sort-value="0.84" | 840 m || 
|-id=220 bgcolor=#E9E9E9
| 376220 ||  || — || March 21, 1993 || La Silla || UESAC || — || align=right | 2.2 km || 
|-id=221 bgcolor=#d6d6d6
| 376221 ||  || — || January 30, 2006 || Kitt Peak || Spacewatch || — || align=right | 2.0 km || 
|-id=222 bgcolor=#E9E9E9
| 376222 ||  || — || December 14, 2001 || Socorro || LINEAR || RAF || align=right | 1.1 km || 
|-id=223 bgcolor=#fefefe
| 376223 ||  || — || February 6, 2007 || Mount Lemmon || Mount Lemmon Survey || NYS || align=right data-sort-value="0.64" | 640 m || 
|-id=224 bgcolor=#d6d6d6
| 376224 ||  || — || October 2, 2008 || Kitt Peak || Spacewatch || — || align=right | 3.5 km || 
|-id=225 bgcolor=#d6d6d6
| 376225 ||  || — || October 10, 2008 || Mount Lemmon || Mount Lemmon Survey || — || align=right | 3.8 km || 
|-id=226 bgcolor=#E9E9E9
| 376226 ||  || — || October 26, 2009 || Mount Lemmon || Mount Lemmon Survey || ADE || align=right | 1.7 km || 
|-id=227 bgcolor=#E9E9E9
| 376227 ||  || — || October 8, 2004 || Kitt Peak || Spacewatch || — || align=right | 1.7 km || 
|-id=228 bgcolor=#d6d6d6
| 376228 ||  || — || September 29, 2008 || Mount Lemmon || Mount Lemmon Survey || URS || align=right | 3.8 km || 
|-id=229 bgcolor=#fefefe
| 376229 ||  || — || December 14, 2006 || Mount Lemmon || Mount Lemmon Survey || — || align=right | 1.1 km || 
|-id=230 bgcolor=#fefefe
| 376230 ||  || — || November 22, 2006 || Mount Lemmon || Mount Lemmon Survey || NYS || align=right data-sort-value="0.63" | 630 m || 
|-id=231 bgcolor=#E9E9E9
| 376231 ||  || — || February 1, 2006 || Kitt Peak || Spacewatch || — || align=right | 2.5 km || 
|-id=232 bgcolor=#E9E9E9
| 376232 ||  || — || March 11, 2007 || Mount Lemmon || Mount Lemmon Survey || RAF || align=right | 1.2 km || 
|-id=233 bgcolor=#d6d6d6
| 376233 ||  || — || November 18, 2003 || Kitt Peak || Spacewatch || — || align=right | 3.9 km || 
|-id=234 bgcolor=#E9E9E9
| 376234 ||  || — || November 18, 1995 || Kitt Peak || Spacewatch || WIT || align=right | 1.6 km || 
|-id=235 bgcolor=#E9E9E9
| 376235 ||  || — || February 22, 2006 || Anderson Mesa || LONEOS || WAT || align=right | 2.5 km || 
|-id=236 bgcolor=#d6d6d6
| 376236 ||  || — || November 6, 2008 || Mount Lemmon || Mount Lemmon Survey || VER || align=right | 2.9 km || 
|-id=237 bgcolor=#d6d6d6
| 376237 ||  || — || November 29, 1999 || Kitt Peak || Spacewatch || KOR || align=right | 1.8 km || 
|-id=238 bgcolor=#d6d6d6
| 376238 ||  || — || March 3, 2010 || WISE || WISE || NAE || align=right | 3.2 km || 
|-id=239 bgcolor=#E9E9E9
| 376239 ||  || — || April 15, 2007 || Kitt Peak || Spacewatch || — || align=right | 2.5 km || 
|-id=240 bgcolor=#d6d6d6
| 376240 ||  || — || September 21, 2007 || Kitt Peak || Spacewatch || — || align=right | 4.5 km || 
|-id=241 bgcolor=#d6d6d6
| 376241 ||  || — || February 25, 2011 || Kitt Peak || Spacewatch || — || align=right | 4.5 km || 
|-id=242 bgcolor=#d6d6d6
| 376242 ||  || — || April 19, 2006 || Anderson Mesa || LONEOS || — || align=right | 3.9 km || 
|-id=243 bgcolor=#E9E9E9
| 376243 ||  || — || March 15, 2007 || Mount Lemmon || Mount Lemmon Survey || — || align=right | 3.0 km || 
|-id=244 bgcolor=#fefefe
| 376244 ||  || — || December 14, 2006 || Kitt Peak || Spacewatch || NYS || align=right data-sort-value="0.86" | 860 m || 
|-id=245 bgcolor=#E9E9E9
| 376245 ||  || — || March 29, 2007 || Kitt Peak || Spacewatch || — || align=right data-sort-value="0.98" | 980 m || 
|-id=246 bgcolor=#FA8072
| 376246 ||  || — || April 16, 2007 || Catalina || CSS || — || align=right | 1.3 km || 
|-id=247 bgcolor=#E9E9E9
| 376247 ||  || — || October 29, 2005 || Kitt Peak || Spacewatch || — || align=right | 1.3 km || 
|-id=248 bgcolor=#fefefe
| 376248 ||  || — || September 16, 2009 || Kitt Peak || Spacewatch || — || align=right data-sort-value="0.91" | 910 m || 
|-id=249 bgcolor=#E9E9E9
| 376249 ||  || — || January 22, 2006 || Mount Lemmon || Mount Lemmon Survey || AST || align=right | 2.9 km || 
|-id=250 bgcolor=#d6d6d6
| 376250 ||  || — || March 4, 2005 || Mount Lemmon || Mount Lemmon Survey || THM || align=right | 2.9 km || 
|-id=251 bgcolor=#E9E9E9
| 376251 ||  || — || December 28, 2005 || Kitt Peak || Spacewatch || PAD || align=right | 1.8 km || 
|-id=252 bgcolor=#E9E9E9
| 376252 ||  || — || April 18, 2007 || Kitt Peak || Spacewatch || WIT || align=right | 1.5 km || 
|-id=253 bgcolor=#E9E9E9
| 376253 ||  || — || April 18, 2007 || Mount Lemmon || Mount Lemmon Survey || — || align=right | 3.0 km || 
|-id=254 bgcolor=#d6d6d6
| 376254 ||  || — || September 28, 2008 || Mount Lemmon || Mount Lemmon Survey || — || align=right | 2.8 km || 
|-id=255 bgcolor=#d6d6d6
| 376255 ||  || — || April 7, 2010 || WISE || WISE || EUP || align=right | 4.2 km || 
|-id=256 bgcolor=#E9E9E9
| 376256 ||  || — || November 6, 2005 || Catalina || CSS || GER || align=right | 1.6 km || 
|-id=257 bgcolor=#d6d6d6
| 376257 ||  || — || December 11, 2004 || Kitt Peak || Spacewatch || 628 || align=right | 2.2 km || 
|-id=258 bgcolor=#E9E9E9
| 376258 ||  || — || October 11, 2004 || Kitt Peak || Spacewatch || — || align=right | 2.6 km || 
|-id=259 bgcolor=#d6d6d6
| 376259 ||  || — || January 29, 1995 || Kitt Peak || Spacewatch || — || align=right | 2.6 km || 
|-id=260 bgcolor=#d6d6d6
| 376260 ||  || — || March 20, 2010 || WISE || WISE || — || align=right | 3.8 km || 
|-id=261 bgcolor=#d6d6d6
| 376261 ||  || — || April 25, 2000 || Anderson Mesa || LONEOS || — || align=right | 4.7 km || 
|-id=262 bgcolor=#E9E9E9
| 376262 ||  || — || December 19, 2001 || Socorro || LINEAR || — || align=right | 1.3 km || 
|-id=263 bgcolor=#E9E9E9
| 376263 ||  || — || October 4, 2004 || Kitt Peak || Spacewatch || — || align=right | 1.6 km || 
|-id=264 bgcolor=#d6d6d6
| 376264 ||  || — || March 3, 2005 || Catalina || CSS || — || align=right | 3.7 km || 
|-id=265 bgcolor=#d6d6d6
| 376265 ||  || — || January 31, 1995 || Kitt Peak || Spacewatch || — || align=right | 3.2 km || 
|-id=266 bgcolor=#d6d6d6
| 376266 ||  || — || September 24, 2008 || Kitt Peak || Spacewatch || — || align=right | 2.8 km || 
|-id=267 bgcolor=#d6d6d6
| 376267 ||  || — || September 24, 2008 || Mount Lemmon || Mount Lemmon Survey || EOS || align=right | 3.0 km || 
|-id=268 bgcolor=#d6d6d6
| 376268 ||  || — || January 6, 2010 || Mount Lemmon || Mount Lemmon Survey || — || align=right | 4.5 km || 
|-id=269 bgcolor=#d6d6d6
| 376269 ||  || — || April 1, 2000 || Kitt Peak || Spacewatch || — || align=right | 2.9 km || 
|-id=270 bgcolor=#d6d6d6
| 376270 ||  || — || December 17, 2009 || Mount Lemmon || Mount Lemmon Survey || — || align=right | 4.2 km || 
|-id=271 bgcolor=#E9E9E9
| 376271 ||  || — || April 4, 2003 || Kitt Peak || Spacewatch || — || align=right data-sort-value="0.99" | 990 m || 
|-id=272 bgcolor=#E9E9E9
| 376272 ||  || — || January 23, 2006 || Kitt Peak || Spacewatch || — || align=right | 2.7 km || 
|-id=273 bgcolor=#E9E9E9
| 376273 ||  || — || March 13, 2007 || Mount Lemmon || Mount Lemmon Survey || — || align=right | 1.2 km || 
|-id=274 bgcolor=#d6d6d6
| 376274 ||  || — || October 1, 2008 || Kitt Peak || Spacewatch || HYG || align=right | 2.8 km || 
|-id=275 bgcolor=#d6d6d6
| 376275 ||  || — || October 10, 2007 || Kitt Peak || Spacewatch || — || align=right | 3.8 km || 
|-id=276 bgcolor=#E9E9E9
| 376276 ||  || — || January 23, 2006 || Kitt Peak || Spacewatch || — || align=right | 2.8 km || 
|-id=277 bgcolor=#E9E9E9
| 376277 ||  || — || February 2, 2006 || Kitt Peak || Spacewatch || — || align=right | 2.2 km || 
|-id=278 bgcolor=#E9E9E9
| 376278 ||  || — || January 25, 2006 || Kitt Peak || Spacewatch || AST || align=right | 1.8 km || 
|-id=279 bgcolor=#E9E9E9
| 376279 ||  || — || November 17, 2009 || Kitt Peak || Spacewatch || HOF || align=right | 2.4 km || 
|-id=280 bgcolor=#E9E9E9
| 376280 ||  || — || September 16, 2009 || Kitt Peak || Spacewatch || — || align=right data-sort-value="0.80" | 800 m || 
|-id=281 bgcolor=#E9E9E9
| 376281 ||  || — || January 29, 2011 || Kitt Peak || Spacewatch || — || align=right | 2.2 km || 
|-id=282 bgcolor=#d6d6d6
| 376282 ||  || — || October 23, 2008 || Kitt Peak || Spacewatch || THM || align=right | 2.6 km || 
|-id=283 bgcolor=#E9E9E9
| 376283 ||  || — || October 9, 2004 || Kitt Peak || Spacewatch || — || align=right | 1.7 km || 
|-id=284 bgcolor=#E9E9E9
| 376284 ||  || — || October 15, 2004 || Mount Lemmon || Mount Lemmon Survey || — || align=right | 3.0 km || 
|-id=285 bgcolor=#E9E9E9
| 376285 ||  || — || January 8, 2006 || Mount Lemmon || Mount Lemmon Survey || WIT || align=right | 1.1 km || 
|-id=286 bgcolor=#fefefe
| 376286 ||  || — || September 28, 2009 || Mount Lemmon || Mount Lemmon Survey || — || align=right | 1.1 km || 
|-id=287 bgcolor=#d6d6d6
| 376287 ||  || — || May 23, 2006 || Kitt Peak || Spacewatch || — || align=right | 3.7 km || 
|-id=288 bgcolor=#d6d6d6
| 376288 ||  || — || October 1, 2003 || Kitt Peak || Spacewatch || — || align=right | 2.7 km || 
|-id=289 bgcolor=#E9E9E9
| 376289 ||  || — || January 26, 2006 || Kitt Peak || Spacewatch || HOF || align=right | 2.3 km || 
|-id=290 bgcolor=#E9E9E9
| 376290 ||  || — || March 26, 2007 || Mount Lemmon || Mount Lemmon Survey || — || align=right | 2.8 km || 
|-id=291 bgcolor=#d6d6d6
| 376291 ||  || — || February 25, 2006 || Kitt Peak || Spacewatch || — || align=right | 2.5 km || 
|-id=292 bgcolor=#E9E9E9
| 376292 ||  || — || September 11, 2004 || Kitt Peak || Spacewatch || — || align=right | 1.9 km || 
|-id=293 bgcolor=#d6d6d6
| 376293 ||  || — || September 22, 2008 || Kitt Peak || Spacewatch || — || align=right | 2.7 km || 
|-id=294 bgcolor=#d6d6d6
| 376294 ||  || — || October 4, 1994 || Kitt Peak || Spacewatch || BRA || align=right | 1.6 km || 
|-id=295 bgcolor=#E9E9E9
| 376295 ||  || — || January 30, 2006 || Catalina || CSS || MRX || align=right | 1.2 km || 
|-id=296 bgcolor=#d6d6d6
| 376296 ||  || — || February 1, 2005 || Kitt Peak || Spacewatch || — || align=right | 4.0 km || 
|-id=297 bgcolor=#E9E9E9
| 376297 ||  || — || November 20, 2001 || Socorro || LINEAR || — || align=right data-sort-value="0.92" | 920 m || 
|-id=298 bgcolor=#E9E9E9
| 376298 ||  || — || November 25, 2005 || Catalina || CSS || — || align=right | 4.0 km || 
|-id=299 bgcolor=#d6d6d6
| 376299 ||  || — || December 15, 2004 || Mauna Kea || P. A. Wiegert || KOR || align=right | 1.2 km || 
|-id=300 bgcolor=#E9E9E9
| 376300 ||  || — || March 15, 2007 || Mount Lemmon || Mount Lemmon Survey || — || align=right | 1.8 km || 
|}

376301–376400 

|-bgcolor=#E9E9E9
| 376301 ||  || — || October 12, 1999 || Kitt Peak || Spacewatch || GEF || align=right | 1.4 km || 
|-id=302 bgcolor=#d6d6d6
| 376302 ||  || — || March 25, 2006 || Mount Lemmon || Mount Lemmon Survey || — || align=right | 3.4 km || 
|-id=303 bgcolor=#d6d6d6
| 376303 ||  || — || September 14, 2007 || Mauna Kea || P. A. Wiegert || Tj (2.94) || align=right | 4.0 km || 
|-id=304 bgcolor=#d6d6d6
| 376304 ||  || — || March 13, 2010 || WISE || WISE || ALA || align=right | 4.0 km || 
|-id=305 bgcolor=#E9E9E9
| 376305 ||  || — || February 1, 2006 || Catalina || CSS || — || align=right | 3.0 km || 
|-id=306 bgcolor=#d6d6d6
| 376306 ||  || — || November 11, 2009 || Mount Lemmon || Mount Lemmon Survey || — || align=right | 4.9 km || 
|-id=307 bgcolor=#E9E9E9
| 376307 ||  || — || April 11, 2007 || Kitt Peak || Spacewatch || MAR || align=right | 1.4 km || 
|-id=308 bgcolor=#E9E9E9
| 376308 ||  || — || November 9, 1999 || Socorro || LINEAR || — || align=right | 3.2 km || 
|-id=309 bgcolor=#E9E9E9
| 376309 ||  || — || January 25, 2006 || Kitt Peak || Spacewatch || — || align=right | 2.6 km || 
|-id=310 bgcolor=#d6d6d6
| 376310 ||  || — || October 8, 2008 || Mount Lemmon || Mount Lemmon Survey || EOS || align=right | 2.3 km || 
|-id=311 bgcolor=#d6d6d6
| 376311 ||  || — || March 3, 2000 || Anderson Mesa || L. H. Wasserman || — || align=right | 3.5 km || 
|-id=312 bgcolor=#E9E9E9
| 376312 ||  || — || October 24, 2005 || Mauna Kea || A. Boattini || HOF || align=right | 3.1 km || 
|-id=313 bgcolor=#d6d6d6
| 376313 ||  || — || November 7, 2008 || Mount Lemmon || Mount Lemmon Survey || — || align=right | 3.7 km || 
|-id=314 bgcolor=#E9E9E9
| 376314 ||  || — || November 27, 2009 || Mount Lemmon || Mount Lemmon Survey || EUN || align=right | 1.7 km || 
|-id=315 bgcolor=#E9E9E9
| 376315 ||  || — || November 10, 2004 || Kitt Peak || Spacewatch || NEM || align=right | 2.3 km || 
|-id=316 bgcolor=#d6d6d6
| 376316 ||  || — || September 29, 2008 || Kitt Peak || Spacewatch || — || align=right | 2.7 km || 
|-id=317 bgcolor=#E9E9E9
| 376317 ||  || — || October 7, 2004 || Kitt Peak || Spacewatch || — || align=right | 2.3 km || 
|-id=318 bgcolor=#E9E9E9
| 376318 ||  || — || May 22, 2003 || Kitt Peak || Spacewatch || HNS || align=right | 1.3 km || 
|-id=319 bgcolor=#E9E9E9
| 376319 ||  || — || November 6, 2005 || Mount Lemmon || Mount Lemmon Survey || — || align=right | 1.5 km || 
|-id=320 bgcolor=#d6d6d6
| 376320 ||  || — || May 5, 2006 || Kitt Peak || Spacewatch || — || align=right | 2.9 km || 
|-id=321 bgcolor=#E9E9E9
| 376321 ||  || — || April 22, 1998 || Kitt Peak || Spacewatch || EUN || align=right | 1.5 km || 
|-id=322 bgcolor=#d6d6d6
| 376322 ||  || — || August 24, 2008 || Kitt Peak || Spacewatch || — || align=right | 2.5 km || 
|-id=323 bgcolor=#E9E9E9
| 376323 ||  || — || March 5, 2006 || Kitt Peak || Spacewatch || HOF || align=right | 2.9 km || 
|-id=324 bgcolor=#d6d6d6
| 376324 ||  || — || March 3, 2000 || Kitt Peak || Spacewatch || — || align=right | 2.4 km || 
|-id=325 bgcolor=#E9E9E9
| 376325 ||  || — || October 4, 2004 || Kitt Peak || Spacewatch || — || align=right | 1.5 km || 
|-id=326 bgcolor=#E9E9E9
| 376326 ||  || — || May 12, 2007 || Kitt Peak || Spacewatch || PAD || align=right | 2.5 km || 
|-id=327 bgcolor=#E9E9E9
| 376327 ||  || — || May 10, 2007 || Mount Lemmon || Mount Lemmon Survey || — || align=right | 2.4 km || 
|-id=328 bgcolor=#d6d6d6
| 376328 ||  || — || March 10, 2005 || Anderson Mesa || LONEOS || LIX || align=right | 4.9 km || 
|-id=329 bgcolor=#E9E9E9
| 376329 ||  || — || April 19, 2007 || Lulin Observatory || LUSS || EUN || align=right | 1.6 km || 
|-id=330 bgcolor=#d6d6d6
| 376330 ||  || — || September 19, 2007 || Kitt Peak || Spacewatch || — || align=right | 3.3 km || 
|-id=331 bgcolor=#d6d6d6
| 376331 ||  || — || April 29, 2000 || Kitt Peak || Spacewatch || HYG || align=right | 3.9 km || 
|-id=332 bgcolor=#d6d6d6
| 376332 ||  || — || August 21, 2007 || Siding Spring || SSS || — || align=right | 4.3 km || 
|-id=333 bgcolor=#E9E9E9
| 376333 ||  || — || March 2, 1997 || Kitt Peak || Spacewatch || — || align=right | 2.8 km || 
|-id=334 bgcolor=#d6d6d6
| 376334 ||  || — || September 28, 2003 || Kitt Peak || Spacewatch || 629 || align=right | 1.4 km || 
|-id=335 bgcolor=#d6d6d6
| 376335 ||  || — || September 1, 2005 || Kitt Peak || Spacewatch || 3:2 || align=right | 3.9 km || 
|-id=336 bgcolor=#d6d6d6
| 376336 ||  || — || April 12, 2000 || Kitt Peak || Spacewatch || THM || align=right | 2.3 km || 
|-id=337 bgcolor=#d6d6d6
| 376337 ||  || — || March 13, 2005 || Kitt Peak || Spacewatch || — || align=right | 3.2 km || 
|-id=338 bgcolor=#d6d6d6
| 376338 ||  || — || March 11, 2005 || Mount Lemmon || Mount Lemmon Survey || — || align=right | 2.7 km || 
|-id=339 bgcolor=#E9E9E9
| 376339 ||  || — || October 4, 2004 || Kitt Peak || Spacewatch || — || align=right | 3.9 km || 
|-id=340 bgcolor=#d6d6d6
| 376340 ||  || — || October 7, 2008 || Mount Lemmon || Mount Lemmon Survey || — || align=right | 3.4 km || 
|-id=341 bgcolor=#E9E9E9
| 376341 ||  || — || October 9, 2004 || Kitt Peak || Spacewatch || NEM || align=right | 2.8 km || 
|-id=342 bgcolor=#d6d6d6
| 376342 ||  || — || August 29, 2006 || Kitt Peak || Spacewatch || 7:4 || align=right | 4.5 km || 
|-id=343 bgcolor=#d6d6d6
| 376343 ||  || — || January 12, 2010 || Catalina || CSS || — || align=right | 3.3 km || 
|-id=344 bgcolor=#d6d6d6
| 376344 ||  || — || April 27, 2010 || WISE || WISE || EOS || align=right | 4.6 km || 
|-id=345 bgcolor=#E9E9E9
| 376345 ||  || — || October 6, 1999 || Kitt Peak || Spacewatch || MRX || align=right | 1.3 km || 
|-id=346 bgcolor=#d6d6d6
| 376346 ||  || — || December 11, 2004 || Kitt Peak || Spacewatch || — || align=right | 2.4 km || 
|-id=347 bgcolor=#d6d6d6
| 376347 ||  || — || May 22, 2006 || Kitt Peak || Spacewatch || — || align=right | 3.0 km || 
|-id=348 bgcolor=#d6d6d6
| 376348 ||  || — || December 17, 2003 || Socorro || LINEAR || — || align=right | 4.5 km || 
|-id=349 bgcolor=#d6d6d6
| 376349 ||  || — || January 19, 2005 || Kitt Peak || Spacewatch || TEL || align=right | 1.4 km || 
|-id=350 bgcolor=#d6d6d6
| 376350 ||  || — || December 19, 2009 || Mount Lemmon || Mount Lemmon Survey || — || align=right | 3.5 km || 
|-id=351 bgcolor=#E9E9E9
| 376351 ||  || — || December 20, 2009 || Mount Lemmon || Mount Lemmon Survey || WIT || align=right | 1.1 km || 
|-id=352 bgcolor=#d6d6d6
| 376352 ||  || — || July 30, 2008 || Mount Lemmon || Mount Lemmon Survey || — || align=right | 2.8 km || 
|-id=353 bgcolor=#d6d6d6
| 376353 ||  || — || April 30, 2006 || Kitt Peak || Spacewatch || EOS || align=right | 1.7 km || 
|-id=354 bgcolor=#d6d6d6
| 376354 ||  || — || January 8, 2010 || Kitt Peak || Spacewatch || — || align=right | 3.4 km || 
|-id=355 bgcolor=#E9E9E9
| 376355 ||  || — || December 6, 2005 || Kitt Peak || Spacewatch || — || align=right | 1.4 km || 
|-id=356 bgcolor=#d6d6d6
| 376356 ||  || — || March 13, 2005 || Kitt Peak || Spacewatch || EOS || align=right | 2.5 km || 
|-id=357 bgcolor=#d6d6d6
| 376357 ||  || — || May 8, 2006 || Kitt Peak || Spacewatch || CHA || align=right | 1.9 km || 
|-id=358 bgcolor=#E9E9E9
| 376358 ||  || — || November 5, 2004 || Campo Imperatore || CINEOS || — || align=right | 3.4 km || 
|-id=359 bgcolor=#d6d6d6
| 376359 ||  || — || December 14, 1998 || Kitt Peak || Spacewatch || — || align=right | 3.8 km || 
|-id=360 bgcolor=#d6d6d6
| 376360 ||  || — || May 27, 2006 || Kitt Peak || Spacewatch || EOS || align=right | 2.1 km || 
|-id=361 bgcolor=#E9E9E9
| 376361 ||  || — || September 20, 2009 || Mount Lemmon || Mount Lemmon Survey || — || align=right | 1.8 km || 
|-id=362 bgcolor=#E9E9E9
| 376362 ||  || — || August 28, 2009 || Kitt Peak || Spacewatch || — || align=right | 3.4 km || 
|-id=363 bgcolor=#d6d6d6
| 376363 ||  || — || June 3, 2010 || WISE || WISE || — || align=right | 4.6 km || 
|-id=364 bgcolor=#d6d6d6
| 376364 ||  || — || February 14, 2010 || Kitt Peak || Spacewatch || SHU3:2 || align=right | 6.2 km || 
|-id=365 bgcolor=#E9E9E9
| 376365 ||  || — || October 4, 1999 || Kitt Peak || Spacewatch || — || align=right | 2.9 km || 
|-id=366 bgcolor=#E9E9E9
| 376366 ||  || — || November 6, 2005 || Mount Lemmon || Mount Lemmon Survey || — || align=right data-sort-value="0.96" | 960 m || 
|-id=367 bgcolor=#d6d6d6
| 376367 ||  || — || May 4, 2005 || Kitt Peak || Spacewatch || — || align=right | 3.9 km || 
|-id=368 bgcolor=#d6d6d6
| 376368 ||  || — || August 24, 2007 || Kitt Peak || Spacewatch || — || align=right | 3.5 km || 
|-id=369 bgcolor=#E9E9E9
| 376369 ||  || — || November 27, 2000 || Kitt Peak || Spacewatch || EUN || align=right | 1.6 km || 
|-id=370 bgcolor=#C2FFFF
| 376370 ||  || — || January 10, 2006 || Mount Lemmon || Mount Lemmon Survey || L5 || align=right | 10 km || 
|-id=371 bgcolor=#C2FFFF
| 376371 ||  || — || July 5, 2011 || Westfield || ARO || L5 || align=right | 8.0 km || 
|-id=372 bgcolor=#fefefe
| 376372 ||  || — || September 24, 2000 || Socorro || LINEAR || MAS || align=right data-sort-value="0.73" | 730 m || 
|-id=373 bgcolor=#C2FFFF
| 376373 ||  || — || December 19, 2004 || Mount Lemmon || Mount Lemmon Survey || L5 || align=right | 11 km || 
|-id=374 bgcolor=#d6d6d6
| 376374 ||  || — || February 4, 2003 || La Silla || C. Barbieri || — || align=right | 2.7 km || 
|-id=375 bgcolor=#fefefe
| 376375 ||  || — || May 13, 2007 || Mount Lemmon || Mount Lemmon Survey || H || align=right data-sort-value="0.67" | 670 m || 
|-id=376 bgcolor=#FA8072
| 376376 ||  || — || September 6, 2008 || Siding Spring || SSS || H || align=right data-sort-value="0.77" | 770 m || 
|-id=377 bgcolor=#fefefe
| 376377 ||  || — || December 6, 2007 || Kitt Peak || Spacewatch || V || align=right data-sort-value="0.69" | 690 m || 
|-id=378 bgcolor=#fefefe
| 376378 ||  || — || November 4, 2007 || Kitt Peak || Spacewatch || — || align=right data-sort-value="0.82" | 820 m || 
|-id=379 bgcolor=#E9E9E9
| 376379 ||  || — || April 16, 2004 || Kitt Peak || Spacewatch || — || align=right | 1.1 km || 
|-id=380 bgcolor=#E9E9E9
| 376380 ||  || — || September 22, 2009 || Kitt Peak || Spacewatch || — || align=right | 2.3 km || 
|-id=381 bgcolor=#fefefe
| 376381 ||  || — || March 24, 2009 || Kitt Peak || Spacewatch || — || align=right data-sort-value="0.64" | 640 m || 
|-id=382 bgcolor=#fefefe
| 376382 ||  || — || September 27, 2003 || Kitt Peak || Spacewatch || — || align=right data-sort-value="0.85" | 850 m || 
|-id=383 bgcolor=#fefefe
| 376383 ||  || — || September 18, 2010 || Mount Lemmon || Mount Lemmon Survey || FLO || align=right data-sort-value="0.62" | 620 m || 
|-id=384 bgcolor=#fefefe
| 376384 ||  || — || June 6, 2005 || Kitt Peak || Spacewatch || — || align=right data-sort-value="0.79" | 790 m || 
|-id=385 bgcolor=#fefefe
| 376385 ||  || — || September 30, 2005 || Anderson Mesa || LONEOS || H || align=right | 1.1 km || 
|-id=386 bgcolor=#fefefe
| 376386 ||  || — || February 8, 2008 || Mount Lemmon || Mount Lemmon Survey || — || align=right data-sort-value="0.81" | 810 m || 
|-id=387 bgcolor=#fefefe
| 376387 ||  || — || February 26, 2008 || Kitt Peak || Spacewatch || MAS || align=right data-sort-value="0.66" | 660 m || 
|-id=388 bgcolor=#fefefe
| 376388 ||  || — || January 13, 2005 || Kitt Peak || Spacewatch || — || align=right data-sort-value="0.87" | 870 m || 
|-id=389 bgcolor=#fefefe
| 376389 ||  || — || September 21, 2003 || Kitt Peak || Spacewatch || — || align=right data-sort-value="0.80" | 800 m || 
|-id=390 bgcolor=#fefefe
| 376390 ||  || — || March 8, 2005 || Siding Spring || SSS || PHO || align=right | 1.6 km || 
|-id=391 bgcolor=#fefefe
| 376391 ||  || — || February 7, 2002 || Kitt Peak || Spacewatch || — || align=right data-sort-value="0.78" | 780 m || 
|-id=392 bgcolor=#fefefe
| 376392 ||  || — || May 23, 1999 || Kitt Peak || Spacewatch || — || align=right data-sort-value="0.82" | 820 m || 
|-id=393 bgcolor=#fefefe
| 376393 ||  || — || November 27, 2006 || Mount Lemmon || Mount Lemmon Survey || MAS || align=right data-sort-value="0.83" | 830 m || 
|-id=394 bgcolor=#fefefe
| 376394 ||  || — || March 3, 2005 || Catalina || CSS || FLO || align=right data-sort-value="0.67" | 670 m || 
|-id=395 bgcolor=#fefefe
| 376395 ||  || — || November 18, 2007 || Mount Lemmon || Mount Lemmon Survey || — || align=right | 1.1 km || 
|-id=396 bgcolor=#fefefe
| 376396 ||  || — || January 18, 2008 || Kitt Peak || Spacewatch || — || align=right data-sort-value="0.81" | 810 m || 
|-id=397 bgcolor=#fefefe
| 376397 ||  || — || March 8, 2005 || Mount Lemmon || Mount Lemmon Survey || V || align=right data-sort-value="0.58" | 580 m || 
|-id=398 bgcolor=#fefefe
| 376398 ||  || — || June 8, 2002 || Socorro || LINEAR || FLO || align=right data-sort-value="0.66" | 660 m || 
|-id=399 bgcolor=#fefefe
| 376399 ||  || — || March 11, 2005 || Kitt Peak || Spacewatch || V || align=right data-sort-value="0.62" | 620 m || 
|-id=400 bgcolor=#fefefe
| 376400 ||  || — || July 4, 2005 || Siding Spring || SSS || — || align=right | 1.1 km || 
|}

376401–376500 

|-bgcolor=#fefefe
| 376401 ||  || — || March 13, 2005 || Kitt Peak || Spacewatch || critical || align=right data-sort-value="0.65" | 650 m || 
|-id=402 bgcolor=#fefefe
| 376402 ||  || — || February 27, 2012 || Haleakala || Pan-STARRS || V || align=right data-sort-value="0.85" | 850 m || 
|-id=403 bgcolor=#E9E9E9
| 376403 ||  || — || October 26, 2005 || Kitt Peak || Spacewatch || BRG || align=right | 1.6 km || 
|-id=404 bgcolor=#fefefe
| 376404 ||  || — || October 9, 2007 || Mount Lemmon || Mount Lemmon Survey || FLO || align=right data-sort-value="0.58" | 580 m || 
|-id=405 bgcolor=#E9E9E9
| 376405 ||  || — || September 26, 2009 || Kitt Peak || Spacewatch || XIZ || align=right | 1.5 km || 
|-id=406 bgcolor=#E9E9E9
| 376406 ||  || — || September 8, 2004 || Socorro || LINEAR || IAN || align=right | 1.2 km || 
|-id=407 bgcolor=#fefefe
| 376407 ||  || — || April 24, 2001 || Kitt Peak || Spacewatch || MAS || align=right data-sort-value="0.75" | 750 m || 
|-id=408 bgcolor=#fefefe
| 376408 ||  || — || February 2, 2008 || Kitt Peak || Spacewatch || — || align=right data-sort-value="0.86" | 860 m || 
|-id=409 bgcolor=#E9E9E9
| 376409 ||  || — || March 15, 2008 || Mount Lemmon || Mount Lemmon Survey || — || align=right | 1.1 km || 
|-id=410 bgcolor=#fefefe
| 376410 ||  || — || September 25, 2006 || Kitt Peak || Spacewatch || FLO || align=right data-sort-value="0.74" | 740 m || 
|-id=411 bgcolor=#fefefe
| 376411 ||  || — || April 2, 2002 || Kitt Peak || Spacewatch || FLO || align=right data-sort-value="0.68" | 680 m || 
|-id=412 bgcolor=#fefefe
| 376412 ||  || — || October 8, 1994 || Kitt Peak || Spacewatch || — || align=right | 1.1 km || 
|-id=413 bgcolor=#E9E9E9
| 376413 ||  || — || May 4, 2008 || Kitt Peak || Spacewatch || — || align=right data-sort-value="0.81" | 810 m || 
|-id=414 bgcolor=#fefefe
| 376414 ||  || — || September 29, 2003 || Kitt Peak || Spacewatch || FLO || align=right data-sort-value="0.58" | 580 m || 
|-id=415 bgcolor=#E9E9E9
| 376415 ||  || — || September 23, 2000 || Anderson Mesa || LONEOS || — || align=right | 2.1 km || 
|-id=416 bgcolor=#fefefe
| 376416 ||  || — || January 15, 2004 || Kitt Peak || Spacewatch || NYS || align=right data-sort-value="0.79" | 790 m || 
|-id=417 bgcolor=#fefefe
| 376417 ||  || — || September 5, 2010 || Mount Lemmon || Mount Lemmon Survey || — || align=right data-sort-value="0.89" | 890 m || 
|-id=418 bgcolor=#fefefe
| 376418 ||  || — || October 20, 2006 || Mount Lemmon || Mount Lemmon Survey || — || align=right | 1.0 km || 
|-id=419 bgcolor=#E9E9E9
| 376419 ||  || — || November 3, 2005 || Kitt Peak || Spacewatch || — || align=right | 1.9 km || 
|-id=420 bgcolor=#E9E9E9
| 376420 ||  || — || October 2, 2009 || Mount Lemmon || Mount Lemmon Survey || — || align=right | 1.7 km || 
|-id=421 bgcolor=#E9E9E9
| 376421 ||  || — || January 30, 2011 || Haleakala || Pan-STARRS || — || align=right | 2.2 km || 
|-id=422 bgcolor=#fefefe
| 376422 ||  || — || March 11, 2005 || Kitt Peak || Spacewatch || — || align=right data-sort-value="0.75" | 750 m || 
|-id=423 bgcolor=#fefefe
| 376423 ||  || — || November 18, 2006 || Kitt Peak || Spacewatch || NYS || align=right data-sort-value="0.73" | 730 m || 
|-id=424 bgcolor=#fefefe
| 376424 ||  || — || September 25, 2009 || Mount Lemmon || Mount Lemmon Survey || — || align=right data-sort-value="0.80" | 800 m || 
|-id=425 bgcolor=#E9E9E9
| 376425 ||  || — || February 21, 2007 || Kitt Peak || Spacewatch || AEOcritical || align=right | 1.1 km || 
|-id=426 bgcolor=#fefefe
| 376426 ||  || — || May 8, 2005 || Kitt Peak || Spacewatch || V || align=right data-sort-value="0.68" | 680 m || 
|-id=427 bgcolor=#fefefe
| 376427 ||  || — || August 19, 2006 || Kitt Peak || Spacewatch || — || align=right data-sort-value="0.64" | 640 m || 
|-id=428 bgcolor=#fefefe
| 376428 ||  || — || February 24, 2008 || Mount Lemmon || Mount Lemmon Survey || MAS || align=right data-sort-value="0.74" | 740 m || 
|-id=429 bgcolor=#E9E9E9
| 376429 ||  || — || April 12, 2012 || Kitt Peak || Spacewatch || — || align=right | 1.7 km || 
|-id=430 bgcolor=#E9E9E9
| 376430 ||  || — || February 23, 2007 || Kitt Peak || Spacewatch || GEF || align=right | 1.4 km || 
|-id=431 bgcolor=#E9E9E9
| 376431 ||  || — || September 19, 2009 || Mount Lemmon || Mount Lemmon Survey || JUN || align=right | 1.2 km || 
|-id=432 bgcolor=#fefefe
| 376432 ||  || — || November 14, 2006 || Kitt Peak || Spacewatch || NYS || align=right data-sort-value="0.79" | 790 m || 
|-id=433 bgcolor=#E9E9E9
| 376433 ||  || — || April 18, 2012 || Mount Lemmon || Mount Lemmon Survey || — || align=right | 1.4 km || 
|-id=434 bgcolor=#E9E9E9
| 376434 ||  || — || November 20, 2001 || Socorro || LINEAR || — || align=right | 1.0 km || 
|-id=435 bgcolor=#fefefe
| 376435 ||  || — || March 10, 2005 || Catalina || CSS || FLO || align=right data-sort-value="0.72" | 720 m || 
|-id=436 bgcolor=#E9E9E9
| 376436 ||  || — || January 25, 2006 || Kitt Peak || Spacewatch || — || align=right | 2.9 km || 
|-id=437 bgcolor=#E9E9E9
| 376437 ||  || — || March 31, 2008 || Mount Lemmon || Mount Lemmon Survey || MAR || align=right data-sort-value="0.99" | 990 m || 
|-id=438 bgcolor=#E9E9E9
| 376438 ||  || — || October 8, 2005 || Anderson Mesa || LONEOS || KRM || align=right | 3.2 km || 
|-id=439 bgcolor=#fefefe
| 376439 ||  || — || March 3, 2005 || Catalina || CSS || — || align=right data-sort-value="0.81" | 810 m || 
|-id=440 bgcolor=#E9E9E9
| 376440 ||  || — || October 25, 2005 || Kitt Peak || Spacewatch || — || align=right | 1.2 km || 
|-id=441 bgcolor=#fefefe
| 376441 ||  || — || October 19, 2003 || Kitt Peak || Spacewatch || — || align=right | 1.0 km || 
|-id=442 bgcolor=#E9E9E9
| 376442 ||  || — || January 6, 2012 || Haleakala || Pan-STARRS || EUN || align=right | 1.5 km || 
|-id=443 bgcolor=#E9E9E9
| 376443 ||  || — || October 15, 2004 || Mount Lemmon || Mount Lemmon Survey || DOR || align=right | 2.7 km || 
|-id=444 bgcolor=#E9E9E9
| 376444 ||  || — || November 11, 2001 || Kitt Peak || Spacewatch || — || align=right | 1.8 km || 
|-id=445 bgcolor=#E9E9E9
| 376445 ||  || — || May 23, 1998 || Kitt Peak || Spacewatch || — || align=right | 2.9 km || 
|-id=446 bgcolor=#E9E9E9
| 376446 ||  || — || April 25, 2003 || Anderson Mesa || LONEOS || — || align=right | 2.8 km || 
|-id=447 bgcolor=#E9E9E9
| 376447 ||  || — || November 17, 2004 || Campo Imperatore || CINEOS || — || align=right | 2.8 km || 
|-id=448 bgcolor=#fefefe
| 376448 ||  || — || February 8, 2008 || Mount Lemmon || Mount Lemmon Survey || ERI || align=right | 1.7 km || 
|-id=449 bgcolor=#E9E9E9
| 376449 ||  || — || March 24, 2012 || Kitt Peak || Spacewatch || — || align=right | 2.0 km || 
|-id=450 bgcolor=#fefefe
| 376450 ||  || — || March 27, 2008 || Mount Lemmon || Mount Lemmon Survey || — || align=right | 1.0 km || 
|-id=451 bgcolor=#fefefe
| 376451 ||  || — || February 3, 2008 || Kitt Peak || Spacewatch || NYS || align=right data-sort-value="0.67" | 670 m || 
|-id=452 bgcolor=#E9E9E9
| 376452 ||  || — || October 1, 2005 || Mount Lemmon || Mount Lemmon Survey || — || align=right | 1.9 km || 
|-id=453 bgcolor=#E9E9E9
| 376453 ||  || — || November 12, 2005 || Kitt Peak || Spacewatch || — || align=right | 1.0 km || 
|-id=454 bgcolor=#fefefe
| 376454 ||  || — || February 22, 2001 || Kitt Peak || Spacewatch || NYS || align=right data-sort-value="0.72" | 720 m || 
|-id=455 bgcolor=#d6d6d6
| 376455 ||  || — || November 10, 2004 || Kitt Peak || Spacewatch || — || align=right | 2.6 km || 
|-id=456 bgcolor=#d6d6d6
| 376456 ||  || — || February 27, 2006 || Mount Lemmon || Mount Lemmon Survey || EMA || align=right | 2.7 km || 
|-id=457 bgcolor=#E9E9E9
| 376457 ||  || — || January 9, 2007 || Mount Lemmon || Mount Lemmon Survey || — || align=right | 1.2 km || 
|-id=458 bgcolor=#E9E9E9
| 376458 ||  || — || October 28, 2005 || Mount Lemmon || Mount Lemmon Survey || — || align=right data-sort-value="0.90" | 900 m || 
|-id=459 bgcolor=#E9E9E9
| 376459 ||  || — || October 18, 2009 || Mount Lemmon || Mount Lemmon Survey || — || align=right | 1.5 km || 
|-id=460 bgcolor=#fefefe
| 376460 ||  || — || April 8, 2008 || Mount Lemmon || Mount Lemmon Survey || V || align=right data-sort-value="0.72" | 720 m || 
|-id=461 bgcolor=#E9E9E9
| 376461 ||  || — || March 14, 2007 || Kitt Peak || Spacewatch || HNA || align=right | 2.2 km || 
|-id=462 bgcolor=#E9E9E9
| 376462 ||  || — || September 15, 2004 || Kitt Peak || Spacewatch || — || align=right | 1.5 km || 
|-id=463 bgcolor=#E9E9E9
| 376463 ||  || — || October 23, 2009 || Kitt Peak || Spacewatch || ADE || align=right | 2.1 km || 
|-id=464 bgcolor=#E9E9E9
| 376464 ||  || — || September 22, 2009 || Mount Lemmon || Mount Lemmon Survey || — || align=right | 2.0 km || 
|-id=465 bgcolor=#E9E9E9
| 376465 ||  || — || March 11, 2007 || Kitt Peak || Spacewatch || — || align=right | 2.2 km || 
|-id=466 bgcolor=#E9E9E9
| 376466 ||  || — || November 1, 2005 || Mount Lemmon || Mount Lemmon Survey || — || align=right | 2.5 km || 
|-id=467 bgcolor=#E9E9E9
| 376467 ||  || — || August 31, 2005 || Kitt Peak || Spacewatch || MAR || align=right | 1.1 km || 
|-id=468 bgcolor=#E9E9E9
| 376468 ||  || — || January 30, 2011 || Haleakala || Pan-STARRS || — || align=right | 2.5 km || 
|-id=469 bgcolor=#E9E9E9
| 376469 ||  || — || November 25, 2005 || Mount Lemmon || Mount Lemmon Survey || — || align=right | 1.1 km || 
|-id=470 bgcolor=#E9E9E9
| 376470 ||  || — || February 27, 2006 || Kitt Peak || Spacewatch || — || align=right | 3.6 km || 
|-id=471 bgcolor=#fefefe
| 376471 ||  || — || October 14, 2010 || Mount Lemmon || Mount Lemmon Survey || — || align=right data-sort-value="0.86" | 860 m || 
|-id=472 bgcolor=#E9E9E9
| 376472 ||  || — || September 24, 2009 || Kitt Peak || Spacewatch || — || align=right | 1.8 km || 
|-id=473 bgcolor=#E9E9E9
| 376473 ||  || — || January 7, 2006 || Mount Lemmon || Mount Lemmon Survey || 526 || align=right | 3.1 km || 
|-id=474 bgcolor=#d6d6d6
| 376474 ||  || — || September 14, 2007 || Anderson Mesa || LONEOS || EUP || align=right | 3.4 km || 
|-id=475 bgcolor=#E9E9E9
| 376475 ||  || — || December 8, 2004 || Socorro || LINEAR || CLO || align=right | 2.9 km || 
|-id=476 bgcolor=#d6d6d6
| 376476 ||  || — || March 5, 2006 || Kitt Peak || Spacewatch || AEG || align=right | 3.2 km || 
|-id=477 bgcolor=#E9E9E9
| 376477 ||  || — || April 30, 2003 || Kitt Peak || Spacewatch || — || align=right | 1.9 km || 
|-id=478 bgcolor=#d6d6d6
| 376478 ||  || — || August 22, 2007 || Anderson Mesa || LONEOS || — || align=right | 3.7 km || 
|-id=479 bgcolor=#E9E9E9
| 376479 ||  || — || October 30, 2005 || Kitt Peak || Spacewatch || — || align=right | 1.5 km || 
|-id=480 bgcolor=#E9E9E9
| 376480 ||  || — || September 13, 2005 || Kitt Peak || Spacewatch || — || align=right data-sort-value="0.70" | 700 m || 
|-id=481 bgcolor=#fefefe
| 376481 ||  || — || March 6, 2008 || Mount Lemmon || Mount Lemmon Survey || — || align=right data-sort-value="0.76" | 760 m || 
|-id=482 bgcolor=#fefefe
| 376482 ||  || — || December 15, 2006 || Kitt Peak || Spacewatch || MAS || align=right | 1.0 km || 
|-id=483 bgcolor=#E9E9E9
| 376483 ||  || — || September 24, 2009 || Mount Lemmon || Mount Lemmon Survey || — || align=right | 1.3 km || 
|-id=484 bgcolor=#d6d6d6
| 376484 ||  || — || September 29, 2008 || Kitt Peak || Spacewatch || — || align=right | 2.8 km || 
|-id=485 bgcolor=#fefefe
| 376485 ||  || — || April 17, 1998 || Kitt Peak || Spacewatch || NYS || align=right data-sort-value="0.73" | 730 m || 
|-id=486 bgcolor=#E9E9E9
| 376486 ||  || — || November 1, 2005 || Mount Lemmon || Mount Lemmon Survey || NEM || align=right | 2.1 km || 
|-id=487 bgcolor=#d6d6d6
| 376487 ||  || — || March 5, 2006 || Kitt Peak || Spacewatch || — || align=right | 3.2 km || 
|-id=488 bgcolor=#C2FFFF
| 376488 ||  || — || April 1, 2008 || Kitt Peak || Spacewatch || L5 || align=right | 12 km || 
|-id=489 bgcolor=#E9E9E9
| 376489 ||  || — || November 4, 2005 || Kitt Peak || Spacewatch || — || align=right | 2.0 km || 
|-id=490 bgcolor=#E9E9E9
| 376490 ||  || — || October 12, 2009 || Mount Lemmon || Mount Lemmon Survey || — || align=right | 2.2 km || 
|-id=491 bgcolor=#d6d6d6
| 376491 ||  || — || October 31, 2002 || Anderson Mesa || LONEOS || — || align=right | 4.2 km || 
|-id=492 bgcolor=#fefefe
| 376492 ||  || — || April 5, 2008 || Mount Lemmon || Mount Lemmon Survey || — || align=right data-sort-value="0.85" | 850 m || 
|-id=493 bgcolor=#E9E9E9
| 376493 ||  || — || September 17, 2004 || Pla D'Arguines || R. Ferrando || — || align=right | 1.7 km || 
|-id=494 bgcolor=#E9E9E9
| 376494 ||  || — || September 25, 2005 || Kitt Peak || Spacewatch || — || align=right data-sort-value="0.90" | 900 m || 
|-id=495 bgcolor=#E9E9E9
| 376495 ||  || — || September 29, 2009 || Mount Lemmon || Mount Lemmon Survey || — || align=right | 1.5 km || 
|-id=496 bgcolor=#fefefe
| 376496 ||  || — || September 12, 2005 || Kitt Peak || Spacewatch || — || align=right data-sort-value="0.77" | 770 m || 
|-id=497 bgcolor=#fefefe
| 376497 ||  || — || March 13, 2005 || Catalina || CSS || — || align=right data-sort-value="0.82" | 820 m || 
|-id=498 bgcolor=#E9E9E9
| 376498 ||  || — || July 30, 2008 || Siding Spring || SSS || — || align=right | 2.7 km || 
|-id=499 bgcolor=#E9E9E9
| 376499 ||  || — || November 25, 2009 || Mount Lemmon || Mount Lemmon Survey || KON || align=right | 2.1 km || 
|-id=500 bgcolor=#d6d6d6
| 376500 ||  || — || April 19, 2006 || Kitt Peak || Spacewatch || — || align=right | 2.9 km || 
|}

376501–376600 

|-bgcolor=#d6d6d6
| 376501 ||  || — || October 20, 2003 || Kitt Peak || Spacewatch || EUP || align=right | 5.9 km || 
|-id=502 bgcolor=#E9E9E9
| 376502 ||  || — || September 9, 1999 || Socorro || LINEAR || — || align=right | 2.5 km || 
|-id=503 bgcolor=#E9E9E9
| 376503 ||  || — || June 16, 2004 || Kitt Peak || Spacewatch || — || align=right | 3.0 km || 
|-id=504 bgcolor=#E9E9E9
| 376504 ||  || — || June 3, 2003 || Socorro || LINEAR || POS || align=right | 4.5 km || 
|-id=505 bgcolor=#d6d6d6
| 376505 ||  || — || September 5, 2007 || Anderson Mesa || LONEOS || EUP || align=right | 3.4 km || 
|-id=506 bgcolor=#E9E9E9
| 376506 ||  || — || April 18, 1998 || Kitt Peak || Spacewatch || DOR || align=right | 2.1 km || 
|-id=507 bgcolor=#E9E9E9
| 376507 ||  || — || November 10, 2005 || Mount Lemmon || Mount Lemmon Survey || WIT || align=right | 1.3 km || 
|-id=508 bgcolor=#E9E9E9
| 376508 ||  || — || January 28, 2006 || Mount Lemmon || Mount Lemmon Survey || HOF || align=right | 2.8 km || 
|-id=509 bgcolor=#fefefe
| 376509 ||  || — || January 15, 2004 || Kitt Peak || Spacewatch || NYS || align=right data-sort-value="0.64" | 640 m || 
|-id=510 bgcolor=#d6d6d6
| 376510 ||  || — || April 19, 2012 || Mount Lemmon || Mount Lemmon Survey || BRA || align=right | 1.6 km || 
|-id=511 bgcolor=#fefefe
| 376511 ||  || — || February 16, 2004 || Kitt Peak || Spacewatch || V || align=right data-sort-value="0.83" | 830 m || 
|-id=512 bgcolor=#d6d6d6
| 376512 ||  || — || April 2, 2006 || Kitt Peak || Spacewatch || THB || align=right | 3.4 km || 
|-id=513 bgcolor=#E9E9E9
| 376513 ||  || — || November 20, 2001 || Socorro || LINEAR || MAR || align=right | 1.4 km || 
|-id=514 bgcolor=#E9E9E9
| 376514 ||  || — || August 4, 2008 || Siding Spring || SSS || — || align=right | 2.1 km || 
|-id=515 bgcolor=#E9E9E9
| 376515 ||  || — || March 13, 2007 || Kitt Peak || Spacewatch || — || align=right | 2.3 km || 
|-id=516 bgcolor=#d6d6d6
| 376516 ||  || — || August 9, 2007 || Dauban || C. Rinner, F. Kugel || — || align=right | 2.8 km || 
|-id=517 bgcolor=#E9E9E9
| 376517 ||  || — || June 10, 2004 || Socorro || LINEAR || GER || align=right | 1.9 km || 
|-id=518 bgcolor=#E9E9E9
| 376518 ||  || — || October 26, 2005 || Kitt Peak || Spacewatch || — || align=right | 1.3 km || 
|-id=519 bgcolor=#d6d6d6
| 376519 ||  || — || April 2, 2010 || WISE || WISE || — || align=right | 3.9 km || 
|-id=520 bgcolor=#E9E9E9
| 376520 ||  || — || February 17, 2010 || WISE || WISE || — || align=right | 4.3 km || 
|-id=521 bgcolor=#d6d6d6
| 376521 ||  || — || May 30, 2000 || Kitt Peak || Spacewatch || EOS || align=right | 2.5 km || 
|-id=522 bgcolor=#d6d6d6
| 376522 ||  || — || May 9, 2006 || Mount Lemmon || Mount Lemmon Survey || — || align=right | 3.7 km || 
|-id=523 bgcolor=#C2FFFF
| 376523 ||  || — || January 30, 2006 || Kitt Peak || Spacewatch || L5 || align=right | 9.0 km || 
|-id=524 bgcolor=#d6d6d6
| 376524 ||  || — || December 24, 1992 || Kitt Peak || Spacewatch || EOS || align=right | 2.5 km || 
|-id=525 bgcolor=#d6d6d6
| 376525 ||  || — || May 8, 2005 || Mount Lemmon || Mount Lemmon Survey || — || align=right | 3.4 km || 
|-id=526 bgcolor=#C2FFFF
| 376526 ||  || — || March 9, 2005 || Mount Lemmon || Mount Lemmon Survey || L5 || align=right | 8.3 km || 
|-id=527 bgcolor=#C2FFFF
| 376527 ||  || — || January 17, 2005 || Kitt Peak || Spacewatch || L5 || align=right | 8.6 km || 
|-id=528 bgcolor=#C2FFFF
| 376528 ||  || — || December 1, 2003 || Kitt Peak || Spacewatch || L5 || align=right | 13 km || 
|-id=529 bgcolor=#d6d6d6
| 376529 ||  || — || December 1, 2008 || Kitt Peak || Spacewatch || EOS || align=right | 2.6 km || 
|-id=530 bgcolor=#d6d6d6
| 376530 ||  || — || March 14, 2005 || Mount Lemmon || Mount Lemmon Survey || — || align=right | 3.7 km || 
|-id=531 bgcolor=#C2FFFF
| 376531 ||  || — || February 4, 2006 || Kitt Peak || Spacewatch || L5 || align=right | 11 km || 
|-id=532 bgcolor=#C2FFFF
| 376532 ||  || — || March 15, 2007 || Kitt Peak || Spacewatch || L5 || align=right | 7.8 km || 
|-id=533 bgcolor=#C2FFFF
| 376533 ||  || — || August 30, 2000 || Kitt Peak || Spacewatch || L5 || align=right | 9.6 km || 
|-id=534 bgcolor=#C2FFFF
| 376534 ||  || — || March 12, 2008 || Mount Lemmon || Mount Lemmon Survey || L5 || align=right | 8.0 km || 
|-id=535 bgcolor=#C2FFFF
| 376535 ||  || — || March 11, 2007 || Kitt Peak || Spacewatch || L5 || align=right | 14 km || 
|-id=536 bgcolor=#C2FFFF
| 376536 ||  || — || January 30, 2006 || Kitt Peak || Spacewatch || L5 || align=right | 8.3 km || 
|-id=537 bgcolor=#d6d6d6
| 376537 ||  || — || March 21, 1993 || La Silla || UESAC || HIL3:2 || align=right | 7.1 km || 
|-id=538 bgcolor=#C2FFFF
| 376538 ||  || — || March 15, 2007 || Kitt Peak || Spacewatch || L5 || align=right | 11 km || 
|-id=539 bgcolor=#C2FFFF
| 376539 ||  || — || January 19, 2005 || Kitt Peak || Spacewatch || L5 || align=right | 9.6 km || 
|-id=540 bgcolor=#d6d6d6
| 376540 ||  || — || June 8, 2005 || Kitt Peak || Spacewatch || — || align=right | 4.1 km || 
|-id=541 bgcolor=#E9E9E9
| 376541 ||  || — || January 28, 2006 || Catalina || CSS || — || align=right | 1.9 km || 
|-id=542 bgcolor=#C2FFFF
| 376542 ||  || — || April 11, 2008 || Mount Lemmon || Mount Lemmon Survey || L5 || align=right | 12 km || 
|-id=543 bgcolor=#C2FFFF
| 376543 ||  || — || March 26, 2003 || Kitt Peak || Spacewatch || L4 || align=right | 9.3 km || 
|-id=544 bgcolor=#d6d6d6
| 376544 ||  || — || April 11, 2008 || Kitt Peak || Spacewatch || HYG || align=right | 3.1 km || 
|-id=545 bgcolor=#E9E9E9
| 376545 ||  || — || August 23, 2001 || Anderson Mesa || LONEOS || — || align=right | 1.7 km || 
|-id=546 bgcolor=#fefefe
| 376546 ||  || — || November 26, 2003 || Kitt Peak || Spacewatch || — || align=right data-sort-value="0.99" | 990 m || 
|-id=547 bgcolor=#d6d6d6
| 376547 ||  || — || September 14, 2005 || Kitt Peak || Spacewatch || KOR || align=right | 1.2 km || 
|-id=548 bgcolor=#E9E9E9
| 376548 ||  || — || November 25, 2005 || Kitt Peak || Spacewatch || DOR || align=right | 3.8 km || 
|-id=549 bgcolor=#d6d6d6
| 376549 ||  || — || September 5, 2002 || Campo Imperatore || CINEOS || — || align=right | 3.5 km || 
|-id=550 bgcolor=#fefefe
| 376550 ||  || — || August 22, 1995 || Kitt Peak || Spacewatch || — || align=right data-sort-value="0.82" | 820 m || 
|-id=551 bgcolor=#fefefe
| 376551 ||  || — || December 13, 2010 || Kitt Peak || Spacewatch || — || align=right | 1.1 km || 
|-id=552 bgcolor=#E9E9E9
| 376552 ||  || — || October 8, 2005 || Catalina || CSS || — || align=right | 1.8 km || 
|-id=553 bgcolor=#E9E9E9
| 376553 ||  || — || September 15, 2009 || Catalina || CSS || — || align=right | 2.3 km || 
|-id=554 bgcolor=#fefefe
| 376554 ||  || — || October 2, 2010 || Mount Lemmon || Mount Lemmon Survey || FLO || align=right data-sort-value="0.68" | 680 m || 
|-id=555 bgcolor=#d6d6d6
| 376555 ||  || — || September 7, 1996 || Kitt Peak || Spacewatch || EUP || align=right | 7.2 km || 
|-id=556 bgcolor=#E9E9E9
| 376556 ||  || — || March 15, 2007 || Mount Lemmon || Mount Lemmon Survey || — || align=right | 2.5 km || 
|-id=557 bgcolor=#fefefe
| 376557 ||  || — || September 5, 2002 || Socorro || LINEAR || H || align=right data-sort-value="0.59" | 590 m || 
|-id=558 bgcolor=#d6d6d6
| 376558 ||  || — || September 22, 2008 || Kitt Peak || Spacewatch || — || align=right | 3.2 km || 
|-id=559 bgcolor=#E9E9E9
| 376559 ||  || — || September 12, 2004 || Kitt Peak || Spacewatch || GEF || align=right | 1.3 km || 
|-id=560 bgcolor=#E9E9E9
| 376560 ||  || — || August 17, 2009 || Kitt Peak || Spacewatch || — || align=right | 4.0 km || 
|-id=561 bgcolor=#fefefe
| 376561 ||  || — || February 12, 2004 || Kitt Peak || Spacewatch || V || align=right data-sort-value="0.79" | 790 m || 
|-id=562 bgcolor=#fefefe
| 376562 ||  || — || September 27, 2000 || Kitt Peak || Spacewatch || FLO || align=right data-sort-value="0.54" | 540 m || 
|-id=563 bgcolor=#fefefe
| 376563 ||  || — || March 17, 2004 || Kitt Peak || Spacewatch || — || align=right | 1.0 km || 
|-id=564 bgcolor=#E9E9E9
| 376564 ||  || — || March 29, 2008 || Kitt Peak || Spacewatch || — || align=right | 1.4 km || 
|-id=565 bgcolor=#d6d6d6
| 376565 ||  || — || March 8, 2005 || Mount Lemmon || Mount Lemmon Survey || — || align=right | 4.1 km || 
|-id=566 bgcolor=#E9E9E9
| 376566 ||  || — || June 11, 2004 || Kitt Peak || Spacewatch || — || align=right | 1.4 km || 
|-id=567 bgcolor=#E9E9E9
| 376567 ||  || — || September 29, 1999 || Catalina || CSS || TIN || align=right | 1.4 km || 
|-id=568 bgcolor=#fefefe
| 376568 ||  || — || March 5, 2008 || Mount Lemmon || Mount Lemmon Survey || V || align=right data-sort-value="0.82" | 820 m || 
|-id=569 bgcolor=#fefefe
| 376569 ||  || — || December 26, 2006 || Kitt Peak || Spacewatch || V || align=right | 1.0 km || 
|-id=570 bgcolor=#E9E9E9
| 376570 ||  || — || January 28, 2007 || Mount Lemmon || Mount Lemmon Survey || — || align=right | 4.1 km || 
|-id=571 bgcolor=#FA8072
| 376571 ||  || — || October 25, 2000 || Socorro || LINEAR || — || align=right data-sort-value="0.69" | 690 m || 
|-id=572 bgcolor=#d6d6d6
| 376572 ||  || — || November 7, 2005 || Mauna Kea || A. Boattini || — || align=right | 2.5 km || 
|-id=573 bgcolor=#d6d6d6
| 376573 ||  || — || March 4, 2005 || Kitt Peak || Spacewatch || — || align=right | 3.7 km || 
|-id=574 bgcolor=#fefefe
| 376574 Michalkusiak ||  ||  || January 19, 2007 || Pla D'Arguines || R. Ferrando || — || align=right | 1.4 km || 
|-id=575 bgcolor=#E9E9E9
| 376575 ||  || — || October 7, 2004 || Kitt Peak || Spacewatch || — || align=right | 2.4 km || 
|-id=576 bgcolor=#E9E9E9
| 376576 ||  || — || October 10, 2005 || Catalina || CSS || — || align=right | 1.3 km || 
|-id=577 bgcolor=#E9E9E9
| 376577 ||  || — || April 7, 2008 || Catalina || CSS || — || align=right | 1.4 km || 
|-id=578 bgcolor=#fefefe
| 376578 ||  || — || October 21, 2006 || Kitt Peak || Spacewatch || — || align=right data-sort-value="0.84" | 840 m || 
|-id=579 bgcolor=#fefefe
| 376579 ||  || — || August 12, 1994 || La Silla || E. W. Elst || NYS || align=right data-sort-value="0.76" | 760 m || 
|-id=580 bgcolor=#E9E9E9
| 376580 ||  || — || May 31, 2008 || Mount Lemmon || Mount Lemmon Survey || — || align=right | 2.1 km || 
|-id=581 bgcolor=#d6d6d6
| 376581 ||  || — || September 4, 2002 || Anderson Mesa || LONEOS || — || align=right | 2.8 km || 
|-id=582 bgcolor=#d6d6d6
| 376582 ||  || — || August 24, 2008 || Kitt Peak || Spacewatch || — || align=right | 2.6 km || 
|-id=583 bgcolor=#E9E9E9
| 376583 ||  || — || October 8, 2005 || Kitt Peak || Spacewatch || — || align=right data-sort-value="0.90" | 900 m || 
|-id=584 bgcolor=#E9E9E9
| 376584 ||  || — || September 4, 1999 || Kitt Peak || Spacewatch || HOF || align=right | 2.6 km || 
|-id=585 bgcolor=#d6d6d6
| 376585 ||  || — || October 4, 2007 || Mount Lemmon || Mount Lemmon Survey || — || align=right | 3.5 km || 
|-id=586 bgcolor=#fefefe
| 376586 ||  || — || February 26, 2009 || Kitt Peak || Spacewatch || — || align=right | 1.1 km || 
|-id=587 bgcolor=#d6d6d6
| 376587 ||  || — || March 10, 2005 || Mount Lemmon || Mount Lemmon Survey || — || align=right | 4.2 km || 
|-id=588 bgcolor=#d6d6d6
| 376588 ||  || — || December 10, 2005 || Kitt Peak || Spacewatch || EUP || align=right | 4.3 km || 
|-id=589 bgcolor=#d6d6d6
| 376589 ||  || — || October 23, 2008 || Kitt Peak || Spacewatch || — || align=right | 4.9 km || 
|-id=590 bgcolor=#d6d6d6
| 376590 ||  || — || September 14, 2007 || Anderson Mesa || LONEOS || 7:4 || align=right | 5.3 km || 
|-id=591 bgcolor=#fefefe
| 376591 ||  || — || December 27, 2006 || Mount Lemmon || Mount Lemmon Survey || NYS || align=right data-sort-value="0.71" | 710 m || 
|-id=592 bgcolor=#fefefe
| 376592 ||  || — || October 7, 2010 || Sandlot || G. Hug || — || align=right data-sort-value="0.85" | 850 m || 
|-id=593 bgcolor=#fefefe
| 376593 ||  || — || September 26, 2000 || Socorro || LINEAR || FLO || align=right data-sort-value="0.64" | 640 m || 
|-id=594 bgcolor=#d6d6d6
| 376594 ||  || — || January 26, 2006 || Kitt Peak || Spacewatch || — || align=right | 2.4 km || 
|-id=595 bgcolor=#d6d6d6
| 376595 ||  || — || February 24, 2006 || Mount Lemmon || Mount Lemmon Survey || — || align=right | 2.5 km || 
|-id=596 bgcolor=#E9E9E9
| 376596 ||  || — || October 25, 2005 || Kitt Peak || Spacewatch || — || align=right data-sort-value="0.75" | 750 m || 
|-id=597 bgcolor=#d6d6d6
| 376597 ||  || — || October 22, 2008 || Kitt Peak || Spacewatch || HYG || align=right | 3.2 km || 
|-id=598 bgcolor=#fefefe
| 376598 ||  || — || September 16, 2003 || Kitt Peak || Spacewatch || FLO || align=right data-sort-value="0.50" | 500 m || 
|-id=599 bgcolor=#fefefe
| 376599 ||  || — || August 23, 1998 || Kitt Peak || Spacewatch || — || align=right | 1.2 km || 
|-id=600 bgcolor=#E9E9E9
| 376600 ||  || — || February 14, 2002 || Kitt Peak || Spacewatch || — || align=right | 2.0 km || 
|}

376601–376700 

|-bgcolor=#d6d6d6
| 376601 ||  || — || February 14, 2004 || Kitt Peak || Spacewatch || 7:4 || align=right | 4.2 km || 
|-id=602 bgcolor=#E9E9E9
| 376602 ||  || — || October 6, 2005 || Mount Lemmon || Mount Lemmon Survey || — || align=right | 1.6 km || 
|-id=603 bgcolor=#E9E9E9
| 376603 ||  || — || December 25, 2005 || Kitt Peak || Spacewatch || MRX || align=right | 1.3 km || 
|-id=604 bgcolor=#d6d6d6
| 376604 ||  || — || January 7, 2006 || Kitt Peak || Spacewatch || — || align=right | 2.2 km || 
|-id=605 bgcolor=#d6d6d6
| 376605 ||  || — || May 11, 2007 || Mount Lemmon || Mount Lemmon Survey || — || align=right | 2.8 km || 
|-id=606 bgcolor=#E9E9E9
| 376606 ||  || — || January 17, 2007 || Kitt Peak || Spacewatch || — || align=right | 2.3 km || 
|-id=607 bgcolor=#fefefe
| 376607 ||  || — || May 28, 2009 || Kitt Peak || Spacewatch || — || align=right data-sort-value="0.72" | 720 m || 
|-id=608 bgcolor=#fefefe
| 376608 ||  || — || March 17, 2002 || Kitt Peak || Spacewatch || — || align=right data-sort-value="0.90" | 900 m || 
|-id=609 bgcolor=#d6d6d6
| 376609 ||  || — || October 3, 2003 || Kitt Peak || Spacewatch || — || align=right | 2.8 km || 
|-id=610 bgcolor=#d6d6d6
| 376610 ||  || — || January 26, 2006 || Kitt Peak || Spacewatch || KAR || align=right | 1.8 km || 
|-id=611 bgcolor=#E9E9E9
| 376611 ||  || — || September 11, 2004 || Kitt Peak || Spacewatch || AEO || align=right | 1.2 km || 
|-id=612 bgcolor=#fefefe
| 376612 ||  || — || July 6, 2005 || Kitt Peak || Spacewatch || — || align=right | 1.1 km || 
|-id=613 bgcolor=#E9E9E9
| 376613 ||  || — || December 5, 2005 || Mount Lemmon || Mount Lemmon Survey || — || align=right | 1.9 km || 
|-id=614 bgcolor=#E9E9E9
| 376614 ||  || — || October 18, 2009 || Mount Lemmon || Mount Lemmon Survey || — || align=right | 2.1 km || 
|-id=615 bgcolor=#E9E9E9
| 376615 ||  || — || October 12, 2004 || Goodricke-Pigott || R. A. Tucker || — || align=right | 2.8 km || 
|-id=616 bgcolor=#d6d6d6
| 376616 ||  || — || September 20, 2003 || Kitt Peak || Spacewatch || — || align=right | 3.2 km || 
|-id=617 bgcolor=#d6d6d6
| 376617 ||  || — || April 22, 2007 || Kitt Peak || Spacewatch || 628 || align=right | 1.9 km || 
|-id=618 bgcolor=#fefefe
| 376618 ||  || — || September 18, 2003 || Kitt Peak || Spacewatch || — || align=right data-sort-value="0.52" | 520 m || 
|-id=619 bgcolor=#d6d6d6
| 376619 ||  || — || September 21, 2008 || Kitt Peak || Spacewatch || — || align=right | 3.1 km || 
|-id=620 bgcolor=#d6d6d6
| 376620 ||  || — || October 30, 2008 || Mount Lemmon || Mount Lemmon Survey || — || align=right | 3.1 km || 
|-id=621 bgcolor=#fefefe
| 376621 ||  || — || September 14, 1994 || Kitt Peak || Spacewatch || NYS || align=right data-sort-value="0.72" | 720 m || 
|-id=622 bgcolor=#E9E9E9
| 376622 ||  || — || November 29, 2005 || Kitt Peak || Spacewatch || AGN || align=right | 1.6 km || 
|-id=623 bgcolor=#d6d6d6
| 376623 ||  || — || January 26, 2006 || Mount Lemmon || Mount Lemmon Survey || LIX || align=right | 3.6 km || 
|-id=624 bgcolor=#d6d6d6
| 376624 ||  || — || September 30, 1997 || Caussols || ODAS || HYG || align=right | 3.5 km || 
|-id=625 bgcolor=#E9E9E9
| 376625 ||  || — || December 28, 2005 || Kitt Peak || Spacewatch || HOF || align=right | 2.6 km || 
|-id=626 bgcolor=#fefefe
| 376626 ||  || — || November 15, 2003 || Kitt Peak || Spacewatch || — || align=right data-sort-value="0.93" | 930 m || 
|-id=627 bgcolor=#d6d6d6
| 376627 ||  || — || January 15, 1996 || Kitt Peak || Spacewatch || — || align=right | 2.9 km || 
|-id=628 bgcolor=#E9E9E9
| 376628 ||  || — || November 1, 2005 || Kitt Peak || Spacewatch || — || align=right | 1.2 km || 
|-id=629 bgcolor=#E9E9E9
| 376629 ||  || — || March 13, 2007 || Kitt Peak || Spacewatch || — || align=right | 1.5 km || 
|-id=630 bgcolor=#fefefe
| 376630 ||  || — || February 8, 2008 || Kitt Peak || Spacewatch || NYS || align=right data-sort-value="0.78" | 780 m || 
|-id=631 bgcolor=#d6d6d6
| 376631 ||  || — || July 29, 2008 || Mount Lemmon || Mount Lemmon Survey || — || align=right | 3.9 km || 
|-id=632 bgcolor=#E9E9E9
| 376632 ||  || — || September 9, 2004 || Kitt Peak || Spacewatch || HOF || align=right | 2.5 km || 
|-id=633 bgcolor=#E9E9E9
| 376633 ||  || — || April 13, 2008 || Mount Lemmon || Mount Lemmon Survey || BRG || align=right | 1.3 km || 
|-id=634 bgcolor=#E9E9E9
| 376634 ||  || — || September 22, 2009 || Catalina || CSS || ADE || align=right | 3.4 km || 
|-id=635 bgcolor=#fefefe
| 376635 ||  || — || November 2, 2006 || Mount Lemmon || Mount Lemmon Survey || — || align=right | 1.2 km || 
|-id=636 bgcolor=#fefefe
| 376636 ||  || — || February 26, 2009 || Kitt Peak || Spacewatch || — || align=right data-sort-value="0.85" | 850 m || 
|-id=637 bgcolor=#E9E9E9
| 376637 ||  || — || September 19, 2009 || Catalina || CSS || — || align=right | 3.4 km || 
|-id=638 bgcolor=#fefefe
| 376638 ||  || — || April 11, 2008 || Mount Lemmon || Mount Lemmon Survey || — || align=right | 1.1 km || 
|-id=639 bgcolor=#d6d6d6
| 376639 ||  || — || March 2, 2006 || Kitt Peak || Spacewatch || EOS || align=right | 1.9 km || 
|-id=640 bgcolor=#E9E9E9
| 376640 ||  || — || September 9, 2004 || Socorro || LINEAR || — || align=right | 2.1 km || 
|-id=641 bgcolor=#d6d6d6
| 376641 ||  || — || January 19, 2005 || Kitt Peak || Spacewatch || — || align=right | 4.3 km || 
|-id=642 bgcolor=#fefefe
| 376642 ||  || — || November 23, 2003 || Kitt Peak || Spacewatch || FLO || align=right data-sort-value="0.60" | 600 m || 
|-id=643 bgcolor=#d6d6d6
| 376643 ||  || — || January 13, 2005 || Kitt Peak || Spacewatch || EOS || align=right | 2.1 km || 
|-id=644 bgcolor=#d6d6d6
| 376644 ||  || — || January 31, 2006 || Kitt Peak || Spacewatch || KOR || align=right | 1.9 km || 
|-id=645 bgcolor=#fefefe
| 376645 ||  || — || April 8, 2003 || Kitt Peak || Spacewatch || — || align=right data-sort-value="0.59" | 590 m || 
|-id=646 bgcolor=#fefefe
| 376646 ||  || — || January 11, 2008 || Kitt Peak || Spacewatch || — || align=right data-sort-value="0.88" | 880 m || 
|-id=647 bgcolor=#d6d6d6
| 376647 ||  || — || October 1, 2008 || Catalina || CSS || EOS || align=right | 2.4 km || 
|-id=648 bgcolor=#E9E9E9
| 376648 ||  || — || August 30, 2005 || Kitt Peak || Spacewatch || — || align=right | 1.2 km || 
|-id=649 bgcolor=#d6d6d6
| 376649 ||  || — || February 4, 2005 || Kitt Peak || Spacewatch || VER || align=right | 3.2 km || 
|-id=650 bgcolor=#d6d6d6
| 376650 ||  || — || January 28, 2000 || Kitt Peak || Spacewatch || — || align=right | 3.1 km || 
|-id=651 bgcolor=#fefefe
| 376651 ||  || — || August 27, 2006 || Kitt Peak || Spacewatch || — || align=right data-sort-value="0.60" | 600 m || 
|-id=652 bgcolor=#d6d6d6
| 376652 ||  || — || September 4, 2008 || Kitt Peak || Spacewatch || EOS || align=right | 2.2 km || 
|-id=653 bgcolor=#E9E9E9
| 376653 ||  || — || September 18, 2009 || Kitt Peak || Spacewatch || — || align=right | 1.3 km || 
|-id=654 bgcolor=#d6d6d6
| 376654 ||  || — || September 18, 2003 || Kitt Peak || Spacewatch || EOS || align=right | 1.5 km || 
|-id=655 bgcolor=#E9E9E9
| 376655 ||  || — || October 1, 2005 || Kitt Peak || Spacewatch || — || align=right | 1.7 km || 
|-id=656 bgcolor=#d6d6d6
| 376656 ||  || — || November 26, 2009 || Kitt Peak || Spacewatch || EOS || align=right | 2.1 km || 
|-id=657 bgcolor=#d6d6d6
| 376657 ||  || — || September 28, 2003 || Kitt Peak || Spacewatch || — || align=right | 3.4 km || 
|-id=658 bgcolor=#E9E9E9
| 376658 ||  || — || April 1, 2008 || Kitt Peak || Spacewatch || — || align=right data-sort-value="0.85" | 850 m || 
|-id=659 bgcolor=#d6d6d6
| 376659 ||  || — || October 23, 2008 || Mount Lemmon || Mount Lemmon Survey || — || align=right | 2.5 km || 
|-id=660 bgcolor=#d6d6d6
| 376660 ||  || — || February 25, 2006 || Mount Lemmon || Mount Lemmon Survey || — || align=right | 2.8 km || 
|-id=661 bgcolor=#d6d6d6
| 376661 ||  || — || July 30, 2008 || Mount Lemmon || Mount Lemmon Survey || — || align=right | 2.3 km || 
|-id=662 bgcolor=#fefefe
| 376662 ||  || — || August 28, 2006 || Kitt Peak || Spacewatch || — || align=right data-sort-value="0.71" | 710 m || 
|-id=663 bgcolor=#fefefe
| 376663 ||  || — || March 3, 2009 || Kitt Peak || Spacewatch || — || align=right data-sort-value="0.65" | 650 m || 
|-id=664 bgcolor=#E9E9E9
| 376664 ||  || — || December 24, 2006 || Kitt Peak || Spacewatch || — || align=right | 1.6 km || 
|-id=665 bgcolor=#fefefe
| 376665 ||  || — || March 3, 2005 || Catalina || CSS || NYS || align=right data-sort-value="0.59" | 590 m || 
|-id=666 bgcolor=#fefefe
| 376666 ||  || — || September 20, 2003 || Kitt Peak || Spacewatch || V || align=right data-sort-value="0.61" | 610 m || 
|-id=667 bgcolor=#E9E9E9
| 376667 ||  || — || July 11, 2004 || Socorro || LINEAR || — || align=right | 1.6 km || 
|-id=668 bgcolor=#fefefe
| 376668 ||  || — || March 12, 2008 || Kitt Peak || Spacewatch || — || align=right data-sort-value="0.83" | 830 m || 
|-id=669 bgcolor=#E9E9E9
| 376669 ||  || — || December 27, 2005 || Kitt Peak || Spacewatch || — || align=right | 1.2 km || 
|-id=670 bgcolor=#E9E9E9
| 376670 ||  || — || January 28, 2007 || Kitt Peak || Spacewatch || MAR || align=right | 1.4 km || 
|-id=671 bgcolor=#d6d6d6
| 376671 ||  || — || August 23, 2007 || Kitt Peak || Spacewatch || HYG || align=right | 2.8 km || 
|-id=672 bgcolor=#E9E9E9
| 376672 ||  || — || December 25, 2005 || Kitt Peak || Spacewatch || — || align=right | 2.2 km || 
|-id=673 bgcolor=#E9E9E9
| 376673 ||  || — || October 5, 2004 || Kitt Peak || Spacewatch || — || align=right | 2.1 km || 
|-id=674 bgcolor=#d6d6d6
| 376674 ||  || — || January 16, 2005 || Mauna Kea || P. A. Wiegert || — || align=right | 2.5 km || 
|-id=675 bgcolor=#d6d6d6
| 376675 ||  || — || November 9, 1993 || Kitt Peak || Spacewatch || — || align=right | 3.1 km || 
|-id=676 bgcolor=#d6d6d6
| 376676 ||  || — || August 10, 2007 || Kitt Peak || Spacewatch || — || align=right | 2.7 km || 
|-id=677 bgcolor=#d6d6d6
| 376677 ||  || — || February 21, 2006 || Mount Lemmon || Mount Lemmon Survey || CHA || align=right | 1.6 km || 
|-id=678 bgcolor=#fefefe
| 376678 ||  || — || January 25, 1998 || Kitt Peak || Spacewatch || — || align=right data-sort-value="0.57" | 570 m || 
|-id=679 bgcolor=#d6d6d6
| 376679 ||  || — || October 9, 2008 || Mount Lemmon || Mount Lemmon Survey || — || align=right | 3.0 km || 
|-id=680 bgcolor=#d6d6d6
| 376680 ||  || — || September 5, 2007 || Mount Lemmon || Mount Lemmon Survey || — || align=right | 5.4 km || 
|-id=681 bgcolor=#d6d6d6
| 376681 ||  || — || March 4, 2005 || Kitt Peak || Spacewatch || — || align=right | 3.7 km || 
|-id=682 bgcolor=#E9E9E9
| 376682 ||  || — || March 15, 2007 || Kitt Peak || Spacewatch || GEF || align=right | 1.1 km || 
|-id=683 bgcolor=#d6d6d6
| 376683 ||  || — || September 4, 2008 || Kitt Peak || Spacewatch || — || align=right | 2.4 km || 
|-id=684 bgcolor=#d6d6d6
| 376684 ||  || — || August 28, 2005 || Kitt Peak || Spacewatch || 3:2 || align=right | 4.5 km || 
|-id=685 bgcolor=#d6d6d6
| 376685 ||  || — || September 6, 2008 || Mount Lemmon || Mount Lemmon Survey || — || align=right | 2.9 km || 
|-id=686 bgcolor=#d6d6d6
| 376686 ||  || — || January 6, 2010 || Kitt Peak || Spacewatch || — || align=right | 3.4 km || 
|-id=687 bgcolor=#d6d6d6
| 376687 ||  || — || June 15, 2007 || Kitt Peak || Spacewatch || EOS || align=right | 2.1 km || 
|-id=688 bgcolor=#d6d6d6
| 376688 ||  || — || October 27, 2008 || Mount Lemmon || Mount Lemmon Survey || EOS || align=right | 2.4 km || 
|-id=689 bgcolor=#E9E9E9
| 376689 ||  || — || December 13, 2006 || Kitt Peak || Spacewatch || — || align=right | 1.1 km || 
|-id=690 bgcolor=#fefefe
| 376690 ||  || — || October 4, 2006 || Mount Lemmon || Mount Lemmon Survey || V || align=right data-sort-value="0.65" | 650 m || 
|-id=691 bgcolor=#d6d6d6
| 376691 ||  || — || January 30, 2011 || Haleakala || Pan-STARRS || CHA || align=right | 2.1 km || 
|-id=692 bgcolor=#E9E9E9
| 376692 ||  || — || October 27, 2009 || Mount Lemmon || Mount Lemmon Survey || WIT || align=right | 1.0 km || 
|-id=693 bgcolor=#fefefe
| 376693 ||  || — || July 21, 2009 || La Sagra || OAM Obs. || MAS || align=right data-sort-value="0.90" | 900 m || 
|-id=694 bgcolor=#d6d6d6
| 376694 Kassák ||  ||  || January 30, 2011 || Piszkéstető || K. Sárneczky, S. Kürti || — || align=right | 2.7 km || 
|-id=695 bgcolor=#fefefe
| 376695 ||  || — || October 2, 2006 || Mount Lemmon || Mount Lemmon Survey || — || align=right data-sort-value="0.91" | 910 m || 
|-id=696 bgcolor=#E9E9E9
| 376696 ||  || — || October 1, 2005 || Mount Lemmon || Mount Lemmon Survey || — || align=right | 1.4 km || 
|-id=697 bgcolor=#d6d6d6
| 376697 ||  || — || September 21, 2003 || Kitt Peak || Spacewatch || — || align=right | 2.1 km || 
|-id=698 bgcolor=#fefefe
| 376698 ||  || — || July 28, 2009 || Catalina || CSS || — || align=right | 1.0 km || 
|-id=699 bgcolor=#d6d6d6
| 376699 ||  || — || September 22, 2008 || Mount Lemmon || Mount Lemmon Survey || HYG || align=right | 3.4 km || 
|-id=700 bgcolor=#E9E9E9
| 376700 ||  || — || November 18, 2009 || Kitt Peak || Spacewatch || — || align=right | 2.0 km || 
|}

376701–376800 

|-bgcolor=#E9E9E9
| 376701 ||  || — || November 17, 2009 || Mount Lemmon || Mount Lemmon Survey || NEM || align=right | 1.8 km || 
|-id=702 bgcolor=#fefefe
| 376702 ||  || — || March 15, 2004 || Kitt Peak || Spacewatch || NYS || align=right data-sort-value="0.77" | 770 m || 
|-id=703 bgcolor=#E9E9E9
| 376703 ||  || — || December 28, 2005 || Kitt Peak || Spacewatch || — || align=right | 2.2 km || 
|-id=704 bgcolor=#E9E9E9
| 376704 ||  || — || January 5, 2006 || Mount Lemmon || Mount Lemmon Survey || — || align=right | 2.0 km || 
|-id=705 bgcolor=#d6d6d6
| 376705 ||  || — || September 11, 2007 || Mount Lemmon || Mount Lemmon Survey || 7:4 || align=right | 3.5 km || 
|-id=706 bgcolor=#E9E9E9
| 376706 ||  || — || October 28, 1994 || Kitt Peak || Spacewatch || — || align=right | 2.0 km || 
|-id=707 bgcolor=#FFC2E0
| 376707 ||  || — || July 25, 1995 || Kitt Peak || Spacewatch || APO +1km || align=right | 1.5 km || 
|-id=708 bgcolor=#d6d6d6
| 376708 ||  || — || September 21, 1995 || Kitt Peak || Spacewatch || — || align=right | 2.5 km || 
|-id=709 bgcolor=#d6d6d6
| 376709 ||  || — || September 25, 1995 || Kitt Peak || Spacewatch || — || align=right | 4.0 km || 
|-id=710 bgcolor=#E9E9E9
| 376710 ||  || — || September 20, 1995 || Kitt Peak || Spacewatch || — || align=right | 2.3 km || 
|-id=711 bgcolor=#fefefe
| 376711 ||  || — || September 21, 1995 || Kitt Peak || Spacewatch || — || align=right data-sort-value="0.96" | 960 m || 
|-id=712 bgcolor=#E9E9E9
| 376712 ||  || — || October 1, 1995 || Kitt Peak || Spacewatch || — || align=right | 2.4 km || 
|-id=713 bgcolor=#FA8072
| 376713 ||  || — || November 24, 1995 || Siding Spring || R. H. McNaught || — || align=right | 1.3 km || 
|-id=714 bgcolor=#d6d6d6
| 376714 ||  || — || April 12, 1996 || Kitt Peak || Spacewatch || — || align=right | 2.3 km || 
|-id=715 bgcolor=#E9E9E9
| 376715 ||  || — || September 15, 1996 || Kitt Peak || Spacewatch || — || align=right | 1.1 km || 
|-id=716 bgcolor=#E9E9E9
| 376716 ||  || — || September 19, 1996 || Kitt Peak || Spacewatch || — || align=right data-sort-value="0.91" | 910 m || 
|-id=717 bgcolor=#d6d6d6
| 376717 ||  || — || October 4, 1996 || Kitt Peak || Spacewatch || — || align=right | 2.9 km || 
|-id=718 bgcolor=#fefefe
| 376718 ||  || — || November 7, 1996 || Kitt Peak || Spacewatch || — || align=right data-sort-value="0.92" | 920 m || 
|-id=719 bgcolor=#d6d6d6
| 376719 ||  || — || November 4, 1996 || Kitt Peak || Spacewatch || VER || align=right | 2.7 km || 
|-id=720 bgcolor=#FA8072
| 376720 ||  || — || February 6, 1997 || Haleakala || NEAT || — || align=right | 1.6 km || 
|-id=721 bgcolor=#FA8072
| 376721 ||  || — || April 8, 1997 || Kitt Peak || Spacewatch || — || align=right data-sort-value="0.75" | 750 m || 
|-id=722 bgcolor=#E9E9E9
| 376722 ||  || — || April 28, 1997 || Kitt Peak || Spacewatch || GEF || align=right | 1.4 km || 
|-id=723 bgcolor=#d6d6d6
| 376723 ||  || — || September 28, 1997 || Kitt Peak || Spacewatch || EOS || align=right | 2.1 km || 
|-id=724 bgcolor=#d6d6d6
| 376724 ||  || — || October 23, 1997 || Kitt Peak || Spacewatch || — || align=right | 2.0 km || 
|-id=725 bgcolor=#E9E9E9
| 376725 ||  || — || March 24, 1998 || Bergisch Gladbac || W. Bickel || — || align=right | 2.3 km || 
|-id=726 bgcolor=#fefefe
| 376726 ||  || — || May 7, 1998 || Caussols || ODAS || PHO || align=right | 1.4 km || 
|-id=727 bgcolor=#d6d6d6
| 376727 ||  || — || August 30, 1998 || Kitt Peak || Spacewatch || KOR || align=right | 1.2 km || 
|-id=728 bgcolor=#fefefe
| 376728 ||  || — || November 16, 1998 || Kitt Peak || Spacewatch || NYS || align=right data-sort-value="0.66" | 660 m || 
|-id=729 bgcolor=#FFC2E0
| 376729 ||  || — || December 22, 1998 || Socorro || LINEAR || AMO || align=right data-sort-value="0.56" | 560 m || 
|-id=730 bgcolor=#E9E9E9
| 376730 ||  || — || May 8, 1999 || Catalina || CSS || — || align=right | 1.9 km || 
|-id=731 bgcolor=#d6d6d6
| 376731 ||  || — || May 13, 1999 || Socorro || LINEAR || THB || align=right | 5.4 km || 
|-id=732 bgcolor=#E9E9E9
| 376732 ||  || — || May 19, 1999 || Kitt Peak || Spacewatch || — || align=right | 1.9 km || 
|-id=733 bgcolor=#E9E9E9
| 376733 ||  || — || August 7, 1999 || Kitt Peak || Spacewatch || — || align=right | 2.0 km || 
|-id=734 bgcolor=#E9E9E9
| 376734 ||  || — || September 8, 1999 || Socorro || LINEAR || INO || align=right | 1.7 km || 
|-id=735 bgcolor=#E9E9E9
| 376735 ||  || — || October 3, 1999 || Kitt Peak || Spacewatch || AGN || align=right | 1.3 km || 
|-id=736 bgcolor=#fefefe
| 376736 ||  || — || October 6, 1999 || Kitt Peak || Spacewatch || — || align=right data-sort-value="0.57" | 570 m || 
|-id=737 bgcolor=#E9E9E9
| 376737 ||  || — || October 8, 1999 || Kitt Peak || Spacewatch || HNA || align=right | 2.3 km || 
|-id=738 bgcolor=#E9E9E9
| 376738 ||  || — || October 12, 1999 || Kitt Peak || Spacewatch || — || align=right | 1.9 km || 
|-id=739 bgcolor=#E9E9E9
| 376739 ||  || — || October 12, 1999 || Kitt Peak || Spacewatch || critical || align=right | 1.9 km || 
|-id=740 bgcolor=#E9E9E9
| 376740 ||  || — || October 13, 1999 || Kitt Peak || Spacewatch || — || align=right | 2.3 km || 
|-id=741 bgcolor=#E9E9E9
| 376741 ||  || — || October 4, 1999 || Socorro || LINEAR || GEF || align=right | 1.9 km || 
|-id=742 bgcolor=#fefefe
| 376742 ||  || — || October 3, 1999 || Kitt Peak || Spacewatch || — || align=right data-sort-value="0.76" | 760 m || 
|-id=743 bgcolor=#E9E9E9
| 376743 ||  || — || October 9, 1999 || Socorro || LINEAR || GEF || align=right | 1.6 km || 
|-id=744 bgcolor=#fefefe
| 376744 ||  || — || October 13, 1999 || Socorro || LINEAR || — || align=right data-sort-value="0.75" | 750 m || 
|-id=745 bgcolor=#E9E9E9
| 376745 ||  || — || October 3, 1999 || Socorro || LINEAR || — || align=right | 3.3 km || 
|-id=746 bgcolor=#E9E9E9
| 376746 ||  || — || October 3, 1999 || Socorro || LINEAR || — || align=right | 4.0 km || 
|-id=747 bgcolor=#fefefe
| 376747 ||  || — || October 29, 1999 || Kitt Peak || Spacewatch || — || align=right data-sort-value="0.81" | 810 m || 
|-id=748 bgcolor=#fefefe
| 376748 ||  || — || October 30, 1999 || Kitt Peak || Spacewatch || H || align=right data-sort-value="0.66" | 660 m || 
|-id=749 bgcolor=#E9E9E9
| 376749 ||  || — || October 30, 1999 || Kitt Peak || Spacewatch || DOR || align=right | 2.6 km || 
|-id=750 bgcolor=#E9E9E9
| 376750 ||  || — || October 31, 1999 || Kitt Peak || Spacewatch || — || align=right | 2.9 km || 
|-id=751 bgcolor=#d6d6d6
| 376751 ||  || — || October 16, 1999 || Kitt Peak || Spacewatch || 7:4 || align=right | 3.3 km || 
|-id=752 bgcolor=#fefefe
| 376752 ||  || — || November 2, 1999 || Socorro || LINEAR || PHO || align=right | 1.6 km || 
|-id=753 bgcolor=#fefefe
| 376753 ||  || — || November 11, 1999 || Kitt Peak || Spacewatch || FLO || align=right data-sort-value="0.59" | 590 m || 
|-id=754 bgcolor=#E9E9E9
| 376754 ||  || — || November 4, 1999 || Kitt Peak || Spacewatch || — || align=right | 2.2 km || 
|-id=755 bgcolor=#fefefe
| 376755 ||  || — || November 4, 1999 || Socorro || LINEAR || — || align=right data-sort-value="0.74" | 740 m || 
|-id=756 bgcolor=#fefefe
| 376756 ||  || — || November 9, 1999 || Socorro || LINEAR || — || align=right data-sort-value="0.82" | 820 m || 
|-id=757 bgcolor=#E9E9E9
| 376757 ||  || — || November 5, 1999 || Kitt Peak || Spacewatch || WIT || align=right data-sort-value="0.94" | 940 m || 
|-id=758 bgcolor=#fefefe
| 376758 ||  || — || November 9, 1999 || Kitt Peak || Spacewatch || FLO || align=right data-sort-value="0.70" | 700 m || 
|-id=759 bgcolor=#d6d6d6
| 376759 ||  || — || November 10, 1999 || Kitt Peak || Spacewatch || CHA || align=right | 2.0 km || 
|-id=760 bgcolor=#E9E9E9
| 376760 ||  || — || November 14, 1999 || Socorro || LINEAR || — || align=right | 2.6 km || 
|-id=761 bgcolor=#E9E9E9
| 376761 ||  || — || November 13, 1999 || Anderson Mesa || LONEOS || — || align=right | 3.0 km || 
|-id=762 bgcolor=#E9E9E9
| 376762 ||  || — || November 17, 1999 || Kitt Peak || Spacewatch || HOF || align=right | 2.7 km || 
|-id=763 bgcolor=#FA8072
| 376763 ||  || — || December 5, 1999 || Socorro || LINEAR || PHO || align=right | 1.1 km || 
|-id=764 bgcolor=#FA8072
| 376764 ||  || — || December 7, 1999 || Socorro || LINEAR || unusual || align=right | 4.5 km || 
|-id=765 bgcolor=#d6d6d6
| 376765 ||  || — || October 13, 1999 || Socorro || LINEAR || — || align=right | 2.5 km || 
|-id=766 bgcolor=#E9E9E9
| 376766 ||  || — || December 8, 1999 || Kitt Peak || Spacewatch || — || align=right | 2.1 km || 
|-id=767 bgcolor=#fefefe
| 376767 ||  || — || December 13, 1999 || Kitt Peak || Spacewatch || — || align=right data-sort-value="0.79" | 790 m || 
|-id=768 bgcolor=#E9E9E9
| 376768 ||  || — || December 12, 1999 || Kitt Peak || Spacewatch || — || align=right | 1.7 km || 
|-id=769 bgcolor=#fefefe
| 376769 ||  || — || January 7, 2000 || Kitt Peak || Spacewatch || — || align=right data-sort-value="0.73" | 730 m || 
|-id=770 bgcolor=#d6d6d6
| 376770 ||  || — || February 7, 2000 || Kitt Peak || Spacewatch || NAE || align=right | 2.0 km || 
|-id=771 bgcolor=#FA8072
| 376771 ||  || — || February 29, 2000 || Socorro || LINEAR || — || align=right | 1.0 km || 
|-id=772 bgcolor=#d6d6d6
| 376772 ||  || — || March 25, 2000 || Kitt Peak || Spacewatch || TIR || align=right | 3.4 km || 
|-id=773 bgcolor=#fefefe
| 376773 ||  || — || April 5, 2000 || Socorro || LINEAR || NYS || align=right data-sort-value="0.77" | 770 m || 
|-id=774 bgcolor=#d6d6d6
| 376774 ||  || — || April 3, 2000 || Kitt Peak || Spacewatch || EUP || align=right | 3.8 km || 
|-id=775 bgcolor=#FFC2E0
| 376775 ||  || — || April 26, 2000 || Anderson Mesa || LONEOS || AMO || align=right data-sort-value="0.75" | 750 m || 
|-id=776 bgcolor=#d6d6d6
| 376776 ||  || — || April 28, 2000 || Kitt Peak || Spacewatch || — || align=right | 2.9 km || 
|-id=777 bgcolor=#d6d6d6
| 376777 ||  || — || April 27, 2000 || Socorro || LINEAR || — || align=right | 4.3 km || 
|-id=778 bgcolor=#FFC2E0
| 376778 ||  || — || May 4, 2000 || Socorro || LINEAR || AMO +1kmcritical || align=right | 1.5 km || 
|-id=779 bgcolor=#FA8072
| 376779 ||  || — || June 11, 2000 || Socorro || LINEAR || — || align=right | 3.0 km || 
|-id=780 bgcolor=#E9E9E9
| 376780 ||  || — || July 5, 2000 || Anderson Mesa || LONEOS || EUN || align=right | 1.9 km || 
|-id=781 bgcolor=#E9E9E9
| 376781 ||  || — || July 23, 2000 || Socorro || LINEAR || — || align=right | 1.3 km || 
|-id=782 bgcolor=#fefefe
| 376782 ||  || — || August 24, 2000 || Socorro || LINEAR || H || align=right data-sort-value="0.65" | 650 m || 
|-id=783 bgcolor=#E9E9E9
| 376783 ||  || — || August 31, 2000 || Socorro || LINEAR || — || align=right | 2.0 km || 
|-id=784 bgcolor=#FA8072
| 376784 ||  || — || August 31, 2000 || Socorro || LINEAR || — || align=right data-sort-value="0.75" | 750 m || 
|-id=785 bgcolor=#E9E9E9
| 376785 ||  || — || August 31, 2000 || Socorro || LINEAR || — || align=right | 3.3 km || 
|-id=786 bgcolor=#FA8072
| 376786 ||  || — || August 31, 2000 || Socorro || LINEAR || unusual || align=right | 3.1 km || 
|-id=787 bgcolor=#E9E9E9
| 376787 ||  || — || September 1, 2000 || Socorro || LINEAR || BAR || align=right | 2.1 km || 
|-id=788 bgcolor=#FFC2E0
| 376788 ||  || — || September 3, 2000 || Socorro || LINEAR || APO || align=right data-sort-value="0.47" | 470 m || 
|-id=789 bgcolor=#FA8072
| 376789 ||  || — || September 3, 2000 || Socorro || LINEAR || — || align=right data-sort-value="0.87" | 870 m || 
|-id=790 bgcolor=#E9E9E9
| 376790 ||  || — || September 23, 2000 || Socorro || LINEAR || — || align=right | 2.8 km || 
|-id=791 bgcolor=#E9E9E9
| 376791 ||  || — || September 24, 2000 || Socorro || LINEAR || — || align=right | 1.3 km || 
|-id=792 bgcolor=#E9E9E9
| 376792 ||  || — || September 23, 2000 || Socorro || LINEAR || — || align=right | 1.4 km || 
|-id=793 bgcolor=#E9E9E9
| 376793 ||  || — || September 23, 2000 || Socorro || LINEAR || — || align=right | 1.8 km || 
|-id=794 bgcolor=#FA8072
| 376794 ||  || — || September 24, 2000 || Socorro || LINEAR || — || align=right data-sort-value="0.78" | 780 m || 
|-id=795 bgcolor=#E9E9E9
| 376795 ||  || — || September 22, 2000 || Socorro || LINEAR || GER || align=right | 1.9 km || 
|-id=796 bgcolor=#E9E9E9
| 376796 ||  || — || September 23, 2000 || Socorro || LINEAR || — || align=right | 1.7 km || 
|-id=797 bgcolor=#E9E9E9
| 376797 ||  || — || September 26, 2000 || Socorro || LINEAR || GER || align=right | 1.7 km || 
|-id=798 bgcolor=#E9E9E9
| 376798 ||  || — || September 27, 2000 || Socorro || LINEAR || EUN || align=right | 1.6 km || 
|-id=799 bgcolor=#E9E9E9
| 376799 ||  || — || September 28, 2000 || Socorro || LINEAR || — || align=right | 2.4 km || 
|-id=800 bgcolor=#E9E9E9
| 376800 ||  || — || September 28, 2000 || Socorro || LINEAR || — || align=right | 1.8 km || 
|}

376801–376900 

|-bgcolor=#E9E9E9
| 376801 ||  || — || September 29, 2000 || Kitt Peak || Spacewatch || — || align=right | 1.4 km || 
|-id=802 bgcolor=#E9E9E9
| 376802 ||  || — || September 28, 2000 || Anderson Mesa || LONEOS || — || align=right | 2.6 km || 
|-id=803 bgcolor=#E9E9E9
| 376803 ||  || — || September 28, 2000 || Anderson Mesa || LONEOS || JUN || align=right | 1.3 km || 
|-id=804 bgcolor=#E9E9E9
| 376804 ||  || — || October 1, 2000 || Socorro || LINEAR || — || align=right | 1.9 km || 
|-id=805 bgcolor=#E9E9E9
| 376805 ||  || — || September 30, 2000 || Anderson Mesa || LONEOS || — || align=right | 2.2 km || 
|-id=806 bgcolor=#E9E9E9
| 376806 ||  || — || October 25, 2000 || Socorro || LINEAR || — || align=right | 2.0 km || 
|-id=807 bgcolor=#E9E9E9
| 376807 ||  || — || November 1, 2000 || Socorro || LINEAR || — || align=right | 2.1 km || 
|-id=808 bgcolor=#E9E9E9
| 376808 ||  || — || November 19, 2000 || Socorro || LINEAR || JUN || align=right | 1.4 km || 
|-id=809 bgcolor=#fefefe
| 376809 ||  || — || November 21, 2000 || Socorro || LINEAR || H || align=right data-sort-value="0.59" | 590 m || 
|-id=810 bgcolor=#E9E9E9
| 376810 ||  || — || November 20, 2000 || Socorro || LINEAR || IAN || align=right | 1.2 km || 
|-id=811 bgcolor=#FA8072
| 376811 ||  || — || November 30, 2000 || Socorro || LINEAR || — || align=right | 2.0 km || 
|-id=812 bgcolor=#E9E9E9
| 376812 ||  || — || November 28, 2000 || Kitt Peak || Spacewatch || — || align=right | 2.5 km || 
|-id=813 bgcolor=#E9E9E9
| 376813 ||  || — || December 30, 2000 || Socorro || LINEAR || — || align=right | 2.9 km || 
|-id=814 bgcolor=#E9E9E9
| 376814 ||  || — || December 30, 2000 || Socorro || LINEAR || — || align=right | 2.2 km || 
|-id=815 bgcolor=#E9E9E9
| 376815 ||  || — || December 30, 2000 || Socorro || LINEAR || — || align=right | 1.8 km || 
|-id=816 bgcolor=#fefefe
| 376816 ||  || — || December 30, 2000 || Socorro || LINEAR || H || align=right data-sort-value="0.68" | 680 m || 
|-id=817 bgcolor=#FA8072
| 376817 ||  || — || January 4, 2001 || Socorro || LINEAR || — || align=right | 1.5 km || 
|-id=818 bgcolor=#FA8072
| 376818 ||  || — || January 4, 2001 || Socorro || LINEAR || — || align=right data-sort-value="0.83" | 830 m || 
|-id=819 bgcolor=#fefefe
| 376819 ||  || — || January 17, 2001 || Socorro || LINEAR || — || align=right data-sort-value="0.94" | 940 m || 
|-id=820 bgcolor=#fefefe
| 376820 ||  || — || January 19, 2001 || Kitt Peak || Spacewatch || FLO || align=right data-sort-value="0.65" | 650 m || 
|-id=821 bgcolor=#E9E9E9
| 376821 ||  || — || February 2, 2001 || Socorro || LINEAR || CLO || align=right | 2.1 km || 
|-id=822 bgcolor=#fefefe
| 376822 ||  || — || February 16, 2001 || Kitt Peak || Spacewatch || — || align=right data-sort-value="0.84" | 840 m || 
|-id=823 bgcolor=#fefefe
| 376823 ||  || — || March 15, 2001 || Haleakala || NEAT || critical || align=right data-sort-value="0.90" | 900 m || 
|-id=824 bgcolor=#d6d6d6
| 376824 ||  || — || March 19, 2001 || Anderson Mesa || LONEOS || — || align=right | 3.3 km || 
|-id=825 bgcolor=#fefefe
| 376825 ||  || — || March 19, 2001 || Socorro || LINEAR || — || align=right | 1.2 km || 
|-id=826 bgcolor=#fefefe
| 376826 ||  || — || March 19, 2001 || Socorro || LINEAR || — || align=right | 1.0 km || 
|-id=827 bgcolor=#fefefe
| 376827 ||  || — || March 19, 2001 || Anderson Mesa || LONEOS || — || align=right data-sort-value="0.90" | 900 m || 
|-id=828 bgcolor=#fefefe
| 376828 ||  || — || March 16, 2001 || Socorro || LINEAR || — || align=right | 1.1 km || 
|-id=829 bgcolor=#d6d6d6
| 376829 ||  || — || March 21, 2001 || Kitt Peak || SKADS || — || align=right | 1.8 km || 
|-id=830 bgcolor=#FA8072
| 376830 ||  || — || June 27, 2001 || Palomar || NEAT || — || align=right data-sort-value="0.86" | 860 m || 
|-id=831 bgcolor=#d6d6d6
| 376831 ||  || — || July 18, 2001 || Palomar || NEAT || — || align=right | 4.1 km || 
|-id=832 bgcolor=#d6d6d6
| 376832 ||  || — || July 18, 2001 || Palomar || NEAT || TIR || align=right | 4.0 km || 
|-id=833 bgcolor=#FA8072
| 376833 ||  || — || July 18, 2001 || Haleakala || NEAT || — || align=right data-sort-value="0.62" | 620 m || 
|-id=834 bgcolor=#d6d6d6
| 376834 ||  || — || July 22, 2001 || Palomar || NEAT || MEL || align=right | 5.1 km || 
|-id=835 bgcolor=#d6d6d6
| 376835 ||  || — || August 16, 2001 || Socorro || LINEAR || — || align=right | 4.4 km || 
|-id=836 bgcolor=#FA8072
| 376836 ||  || — || August 19, 2001 || Socorro || LINEAR || — || align=right | 2.1 km || 
|-id=837 bgcolor=#FA8072
| 376837 ||  || — || August 24, 2001 || Palomar || NEAT || — || align=right | 2.1 km || 
|-id=838 bgcolor=#d6d6d6
| 376838 ||  || — || August 26, 2001 || Kitt Peak || Spacewatch || — || align=right | 3.3 km || 
|-id=839 bgcolor=#d6d6d6
| 376839 ||  || — || August 21, 2001 || Haleakala || NEAT || EUP || align=right | 4.8 km || 
|-id=840 bgcolor=#fefefe
| 376840 ||  || — || August 23, 2001 || Anderson Mesa || LONEOS || NYS || align=right data-sort-value="0.86" | 860 m || 
|-id=841 bgcolor=#d6d6d6
| 376841 ||  || — || August 23, 2001 || Anderson Mesa || LONEOS || — || align=right | 4.2 km || 
|-id=842 bgcolor=#FA8072
| 376842 ||  || — || August 25, 2001 || Socorro || LINEAR || — || align=right | 1.3 km || 
|-id=843 bgcolor=#d6d6d6
| 376843 ||  || — || August 20, 2001 || Socorro || LINEAR || — || align=right | 4.2 km || 
|-id=844 bgcolor=#d6d6d6
| 376844 ||  || — || August 20, 2001 || Cerro Tololo || M. W. Buie || — || align=right | 2.0 km || 
|-id=845 bgcolor=#fefefe
| 376845 ||  || — || August 20, 2001 || Cerro Tololo || M. W. Buie || — || align=right data-sort-value="0.90" | 900 m || 
|-id=846 bgcolor=#d6d6d6
| 376846 ||  || — || September 8, 2001 || Socorro || LINEAR || EUP || align=right | 4.4 km || 
|-id=847 bgcolor=#d6d6d6
| 376847 ||  || — || September 10, 2001 || Socorro || LINEAR || — || align=right | 4.2 km || 
|-id=848 bgcolor=#FFC2E0
| 376848 ||  || — || September 15, 2001 || Palomar || NEAT || ATE || align=right data-sort-value="0.44" | 440 m || 
|-id=849 bgcolor=#d6d6d6
| 376849 ||  || — || September 10, 2001 || Socorro || LINEAR || — || align=right | 3.9 km || 
|-id=850 bgcolor=#d6d6d6
| 376850 ||  || — || September 12, 2001 || Socorro || LINEAR || URS || align=right | 3.8 km || 
|-id=851 bgcolor=#fefefe
| 376851 ||  || — || September 11, 2001 || Anderson Mesa || LONEOS || LCI || align=right | 1.4 km || 
|-id=852 bgcolor=#d6d6d6
| 376852 ||  || — || September 20, 2001 || Socorro || LINEAR || — || align=right | 3.6 km || 
|-id=853 bgcolor=#d6d6d6
| 376853 ||  || — || September 20, 2001 || Socorro || LINEAR || — || align=right | 4.7 km || 
|-id=854 bgcolor=#d6d6d6
| 376854 ||  || — || September 20, 2001 || Socorro || LINEAR || — || align=right | 2.7 km || 
|-id=855 bgcolor=#d6d6d6
| 376855 ||  || — || September 21, 2001 || Palomar || NEAT || EUP || align=right | 3.9 km || 
|-id=856 bgcolor=#d6d6d6
| 376856 ||  || — || September 30, 2001 || Palomar || NEAT || — || align=right | 4.3 km || 
|-id=857 bgcolor=#E9E9E9
| 376857 ||  || — || September 20, 2001 || Socorro || LINEAR || DOR || align=right | 2.4 km || 
|-id=858 bgcolor=#fefefe
| 376858 ||  || — || September 20, 2001 || Socorro || LINEAR || NYS || align=right data-sort-value="0.82" | 820 m || 
|-id=859 bgcolor=#E9E9E9
| 376859 ||  || — || September 25, 2001 || Socorro || LINEAR || — || align=right | 1.2 km || 
|-id=860 bgcolor=#d6d6d6
| 376860 ||  || — || September 25, 2001 || Socorro || LINEAR || — || align=right | 3.3 km || 
|-id=861 bgcolor=#FA8072
| 376861 ||  || — || October 11, 2001 || Palomar || NEAT || — || align=right | 1.0 km || 
|-id=862 bgcolor=#E9E9E9
| 376862 ||  || — || October 14, 2001 || Socorro || LINEAR || — || align=right data-sort-value="0.86" | 860 m || 
|-id=863 bgcolor=#fefefe
| 376863 ||  || — || October 14, 2001 || Socorro || LINEAR || — || align=right | 1.3 km || 
|-id=864 bgcolor=#FFC2E0
| 376864 ||  || — || October 14, 2001 || Socorro || LINEAR || AMO || align=right data-sort-value="0.35" | 350 m || 
|-id=865 bgcolor=#d6d6d6
| 376865 ||  || — || October 11, 2001 || Palomar || NEAT || — || align=right | 4.1 km || 
|-id=866 bgcolor=#E9E9E9
| 376866 ||  || — || October 14, 2001 || Socorro || LINEAR || — || align=right | 1.5 km || 
|-id=867 bgcolor=#C2FFFF
| 376867 ||  || — || October 14, 2001 || Socorro || LINEAR || L5010 || align=right | 13 km || 
|-id=868 bgcolor=#d6d6d6
| 376868 ||  || — || October 14, 2001 || Apache Point || SDSS || HYG || align=right | 2.9 km || 
|-id=869 bgcolor=#C2FFFF
| 376869 ||  || — || October 14, 2001 || Apache Point || SDSS || L5 || align=right | 9.9 km || 
|-id=870 bgcolor=#fefefe
| 376870 ||  || — || October 17, 2001 || Socorro || LINEAR || — || align=right | 1.1 km || 
|-id=871 bgcolor=#E9E9E9
| 376871 ||  || — || October 20, 2001 || Socorro || LINEAR || — || align=right | 1.7 km || 
|-id=872 bgcolor=#E9E9E9
| 376872 ||  || — || October 23, 2001 || Socorro || LINEAR || — || align=right | 1.0 km || 
|-id=873 bgcolor=#C2FFFF
| 376873 ||  || — || October 16, 2001 || Palomar || NEAT || L5 || align=right | 9.7 km || 
|-id=874 bgcolor=#d6d6d6
| 376874 ||  || — || November 6, 2001 || Socorro || LINEAR || Tj (2.85) || align=right | 4.2 km || 
|-id=875 bgcolor=#E9E9E9
| 376875 ||  || — || November 9, 2001 || Socorro || LINEAR || — || align=right | 2.0 km || 
|-id=876 bgcolor=#FA8072
| 376876 ||  || — || November 10, 2001 || Socorro || LINEAR || — || align=right data-sort-value="0.83" | 830 m || 
|-id=877 bgcolor=#E9E9E9
| 376877 ||  || — || November 12, 2001 || Socorro || LINEAR || — || align=right | 1.1 km || 
|-id=878 bgcolor=#E9E9E9
| 376878 ||  || — || November 12, 2001 || Socorro || LINEAR || — || align=right | 1.3 km || 
|-id=879 bgcolor=#FFC2E0
| 376879 ||  || — || November 18, 2001 || Socorro || LINEAR || AMO || align=right data-sort-value="0.14" | 140 m || 
|-id=880 bgcolor=#E9E9E9
| 376880 ||  || — || November 17, 2001 || Socorro || LINEAR || — || align=right data-sort-value="0.78" | 780 m || 
|-id=881 bgcolor=#E9E9E9
| 376881 ||  || — || November 19, 2001 || Socorro || LINEAR || — || align=right data-sort-value="0.92" | 920 m || 
|-id=882 bgcolor=#E9E9E9
| 376882 ||  || — || November 20, 2001 || Socorro || LINEAR || — || align=right | 2.5 km || 
|-id=883 bgcolor=#FFC2E0
| 376883 ||  || — || December 7, 2001 || Socorro || LINEAR || AMO || align=right data-sort-value="0.50" | 500 m || 
|-id=884 bgcolor=#E9E9E9
| 376884 ||  || — || December 10, 2001 || Socorro || LINEAR || — || align=right | 1.9 km || 
|-id=885 bgcolor=#E9E9E9
| 376885 ||  || — || December 9, 2001 || Socorro || LINEAR || — || align=right | 2.1 km || 
|-id=886 bgcolor=#E9E9E9
| 376886 ||  || — || December 9, 2001 || Socorro || LINEAR || — || align=right | 3.5 km || 
|-id=887 bgcolor=#E9E9E9
| 376887 ||  || — || December 9, 2001 || Socorro || LINEAR || — || align=right | 2.6 km || 
|-id=888 bgcolor=#d6d6d6
| 376888 ||  || — || December 11, 2001 || Socorro || LINEAR || 7:4* || align=right | 3.7 km || 
|-id=889 bgcolor=#E9E9E9
| 376889 ||  || — || December 10, 2001 || Socorro || LINEAR || — || align=right | 2.0 km || 
|-id=890 bgcolor=#E9E9E9
| 376890 ||  || — || December 10, 2001 || Socorro || LINEAR || — || align=right | 2.1 km || 
|-id=891 bgcolor=#FA8072
| 376891 ||  || — || December 15, 2001 || Socorro || LINEAR || — || align=right | 1.6 km || 
|-id=892 bgcolor=#E9E9E9
| 376892 ||  || — || December 10, 2001 || Socorro || LINEAR || EUN || align=right | 1.3 km || 
|-id=893 bgcolor=#E9E9E9
| 376893 ||  || — || December 13, 2001 || Socorro || LINEAR || — || align=right | 1.1 km || 
|-id=894 bgcolor=#E9E9E9
| 376894 ||  || — || December 14, 2001 || Socorro || LINEAR || — || align=right | 3.2 km || 
|-id=895 bgcolor=#E9E9E9
| 376895 ||  || — || December 14, 2001 || Socorro || LINEAR || — || align=right | 1.6 km || 
|-id=896 bgcolor=#E9E9E9
| 376896 ||  || — || December 14, 2001 || Socorro || LINEAR || — || align=right | 1.5 km || 
|-id=897 bgcolor=#E9E9E9
| 376897 ||  || — || December 14, 2001 || Socorro || LINEAR || — || align=right | 1.9 km || 
|-id=898 bgcolor=#E9E9E9
| 376898 ||  || — || December 11, 2001 || Socorro || LINEAR || — || align=right | 1.3 km || 
|-id=899 bgcolor=#E9E9E9
| 376899 ||  || — || December 15, 2001 || Socorro || LINEAR || — || align=right data-sort-value="0.99" | 990 m || 
|-id=900 bgcolor=#E9E9E9
| 376900 ||  || — || December 15, 2001 || Socorro || LINEAR || — || align=right data-sort-value="0.91" | 910 m || 
|}

376901–377000 

|-bgcolor=#E9E9E9
| 376901 ||  || — || December 14, 2001 || Kitt Peak || Spacewatch || — || align=right data-sort-value="0.88" | 880 m || 
|-id=902 bgcolor=#E9E9E9
| 376902 ||  || — || December 9, 2001 || Socorro || LINEAR || — || align=right | 1.8 km || 
|-id=903 bgcolor=#E9E9E9
| 376903 ||  || — || December 23, 2001 || Kingsnake || J. V. McClusky || — || align=right | 4.0 km || 
|-id=904 bgcolor=#E9E9E9
| 376904 ||  || — || December 17, 2001 || Socorro || LINEAR || — || align=right | 1.2 km || 
|-id=905 bgcolor=#E9E9E9
| 376905 ||  || — || December 17, 2001 || Socorro || LINEAR || EUN || align=right | 1.5 km || 
|-id=906 bgcolor=#E9E9E9
| 376906 ||  || — || December 18, 2001 || Socorro || LINEAR || KRM || align=right | 3.6 km || 
|-id=907 bgcolor=#E9E9E9
| 376907 ||  || — || December 18, 2001 || Socorro || LINEAR || — || align=right | 3.1 km || 
|-id=908 bgcolor=#E9E9E9
| 376908 ||  || — || December 18, 2001 || Palomar || NEAT || BRG || align=right | 2.1 km || 
|-id=909 bgcolor=#E9E9E9
| 376909 ||  || — || December 17, 2001 || Socorro || LINEAR || — || align=right | 1.8 km || 
|-id=910 bgcolor=#E9E9E9
| 376910 ||  || — || December 17, 2001 || Socorro || LINEAR || — || align=right | 1.1 km || 
|-id=911 bgcolor=#E9E9E9
| 376911 ||  || — || December 19, 2001 || Socorro || LINEAR || EUN || align=right | 1.7 km || 
|-id=912 bgcolor=#E9E9E9
| 376912 ||  || — || December 19, 2001 || Palomar || NEAT || — || align=right | 1.3 km || 
|-id=913 bgcolor=#E9E9E9
| 376913 ||  || — || January 9, 2002 || Socorro || LINEAR || — || align=right | 1.0 km || 
|-id=914 bgcolor=#E9E9E9
| 376914 ||  || — || January 9, 2002 || Socorro || LINEAR || — || align=right | 1.5 km || 
|-id=915 bgcolor=#E9E9E9
| 376915 ||  || — || January 9, 2002 || Socorro || LINEAR || — || align=right | 1.1 km || 
|-id=916 bgcolor=#E9E9E9
| 376916 ||  || — || January 9, 2002 || Socorro || LINEAR || — || align=right | 1.7 km || 
|-id=917 bgcolor=#E9E9E9
| 376917 ||  || — || January 9, 2002 || Socorro || LINEAR || — || align=right data-sort-value="0.97" | 970 m || 
|-id=918 bgcolor=#E9E9E9
| 376918 ||  || — || January 8, 2002 || Socorro || LINEAR || ADE || align=right | 3.2 km || 
|-id=919 bgcolor=#E9E9E9
| 376919 ||  || — || January 9, 2002 || Socorro || LINEAR || — || align=right | 1.7 km || 
|-id=920 bgcolor=#E9E9E9
| 376920 ||  || — || January 13, 2002 || Socorro || LINEAR || — || align=right | 1.0 km || 
|-id=921 bgcolor=#E9E9E9
| 376921 ||  || — || January 14, 2002 || Socorro || LINEAR || — || align=right | 1.2 km || 
|-id=922 bgcolor=#E9E9E9
| 376922 ||  || — || January 12, 2002 || Kitt Peak || Spacewatch || — || align=right data-sort-value="0.99" | 990 m || 
|-id=923 bgcolor=#E9E9E9
| 376923 ||  || — || January 20, 2002 || Anderson Mesa || LONEOS || — || align=right | 1.0 km || 
|-id=924 bgcolor=#E9E9E9
| 376924 ||  || — || February 6, 2002 || Socorro || LINEAR || — || align=right data-sort-value="0.96" | 960 m || 
|-id=925 bgcolor=#E9E9E9
| 376925 ||  || — || February 6, 2002 || Socorro || LINEAR || — || align=right | 1.1 km || 
|-id=926 bgcolor=#fefefe
| 376926 ||  || — || February 10, 2002 || Socorro || LINEAR || H || align=right data-sort-value="0.59" | 590 m || 
|-id=927 bgcolor=#E9E9E9
| 376927 ||  || — || January 13, 2002 || Socorro || LINEAR || — || align=right | 1.4 km || 
|-id=928 bgcolor=#E9E9E9
| 376928 ||  || — || February 7, 2002 || Socorro || LINEAR || — || align=right data-sort-value="0.99" | 990 m || 
|-id=929 bgcolor=#E9E9E9
| 376929 ||  || — || February 7, 2002 || Socorro || LINEAR || MAR || align=right | 1.3 km || 
|-id=930 bgcolor=#E9E9E9
| 376930 ||  || — || February 7, 2002 || Socorro || LINEAR || — || align=right | 1.9 km || 
|-id=931 bgcolor=#E9E9E9
| 376931 ||  || — || February 13, 2002 || Socorro || LINEAR || — || align=right | 4.5 km || 
|-id=932 bgcolor=#E9E9E9
| 376932 ||  || — || February 8, 2002 || Socorro || LINEAR || — || align=right | 1.1 km || 
|-id=933 bgcolor=#E9E9E9
| 376933 ||  || — || February 9, 2002 || Kitt Peak || Spacewatch || — || align=right | 1.5 km || 
|-id=934 bgcolor=#E9E9E9
| 376934 ||  || — || February 8, 2002 || Socorro || LINEAR || — || align=right | 1.2 km || 
|-id=935 bgcolor=#E9E9E9
| 376935 ||  || — || February 8, 2002 || Socorro || LINEAR || — || align=right | 2.5 km || 
|-id=936 bgcolor=#E9E9E9
| 376936 ||  || — || February 10, 2002 || Socorro || LINEAR || — || align=right data-sort-value="0.93" | 930 m || 
|-id=937 bgcolor=#E9E9E9
| 376937 ||  || — || February 10, 2002 || Socorro || LINEAR || — || align=right | 1.5 km || 
|-id=938 bgcolor=#E9E9E9
| 376938 ||  || — || February 10, 2002 || Kitt Peak || Spacewatch || — || align=right | 2.2 km || 
|-id=939 bgcolor=#E9E9E9
| 376939 ||  || — || February 5, 2002 || Anderson Mesa || LONEOS || — || align=right | 1.9 km || 
|-id=940 bgcolor=#E9E9E9
| 376940 ||  || — || February 6, 2002 || Palomar || NEAT || BAR || align=right | 1.6 km || 
|-id=941 bgcolor=#E9E9E9
| 376941 ||  || — || February 7, 2002 || Kitt Peak || Spacewatch || — || align=right | 2.3 km || 
|-id=942 bgcolor=#E9E9E9
| 376942 ||  || — || February 10, 2002 || Socorro || LINEAR || — || align=right | 1.3 km || 
|-id=943 bgcolor=#E9E9E9
| 376943 ||  || — || February 3, 2002 || Palomar || NEAT || — || align=right data-sort-value="0.89" | 890 m || 
|-id=944 bgcolor=#FA8072
| 376944 ||  || — || February 21, 2002 || Palomar || NEAT || — || align=right | 1.5 km || 
|-id=945 bgcolor=#E9E9E9
| 376945 ||  || — || February 16, 2002 || Palomar || NEAT || ADE || align=right | 2.4 km || 
|-id=946 bgcolor=#E9E9E9
| 376946 ||  || — || March 10, 2002 || Cima Ekar || ADAS || — || align=right | 1.4 km || 
|-id=947 bgcolor=#E9E9E9
| 376947 ||  || — || March 11, 2002 || Palomar || NEAT || — || align=right | 1.8 km || 
|-id=948 bgcolor=#fefefe
| 376948 ||  || — || March 12, 2002 || Palomar || NEAT || — || align=right data-sort-value="0.80" | 800 m || 
|-id=949 bgcolor=#fefefe
| 376949 ||  || — || March 13, 2002 || Socorro || LINEAR || — || align=right data-sort-value="0.77" | 770 m || 
|-id=950 bgcolor=#FA8072
| 376950 ||  || — || March 12, 2002 || Socorro || LINEAR || — || align=right | 1.8 km || 
|-id=951 bgcolor=#E9E9E9
| 376951 ||  || — || March 10, 2002 || Kitt Peak || Spacewatch || — || align=right data-sort-value="0.98" | 980 m || 
|-id=952 bgcolor=#E9E9E9
| 376952 ||  || — || March 13, 2002 || Kitt Peak || Spacewatch || — || align=right | 3.0 km || 
|-id=953 bgcolor=#E9E9E9
| 376953 ||  || — || March 20, 2002 || Kitt Peak || Spacewatch || — || align=right | 2.7 km || 
|-id=954 bgcolor=#E9E9E9
| 376954 ||  || — || March 20, 2002 || Socorro || LINEAR || — || align=right | 2.0 km || 
|-id=955 bgcolor=#FA8072
| 376955 ||  || — || April 8, 2002 || Palomar || NEAT || — || align=right | 1.4 km || 
|-id=956 bgcolor=#fefefe
| 376956 ||  || — || April 9, 2002 || Socorro || LINEAR || H || align=right data-sort-value="0.72" | 720 m || 
|-id=957 bgcolor=#E9E9E9
| 376957 ||  || — || April 6, 2002 || Cerro Tololo || M. W. Buie || — || align=right | 1.2 km || 
|-id=958 bgcolor=#E9E9E9
| 376958 ||  || — || April 4, 2002 || Palomar || NEAT || — || align=right | 2.2 km || 
|-id=959 bgcolor=#E9E9E9
| 376959 ||  || — || April 8, 2002 || Palomar || NEAT || — || align=right | 1.6 km || 
|-id=960 bgcolor=#E9E9E9
| 376960 ||  || — || April 10, 2002 || Socorro || LINEAR || — || align=right | 3.0 km || 
|-id=961 bgcolor=#E9E9E9
| 376961 ||  || — || April 8, 2002 || Palomar || NEAT || — || align=right | 2.6 km || 
|-id=962 bgcolor=#E9E9E9
| 376962 ||  || — || March 16, 2002 || Kitt Peak || Spacewatch || — || align=right | 2.6 km || 
|-id=963 bgcolor=#E9E9E9
| 376963 ||  || — || April 13, 2002 || Palomar || NEAT || — || align=right | 2.6 km || 
|-id=964 bgcolor=#FA8072
| 376964 ||  || — || April 16, 2002 || Socorro || LINEAR || — || align=right | 1.2 km || 
|-id=965 bgcolor=#fefefe
| 376965 ||  || — || May 9, 2002 || Socorro || LINEAR || — || align=right data-sort-value="0.93" | 930 m || 
|-id=966 bgcolor=#E9E9E9
| 376966 ||  || — || April 22, 2002 || Kitt Peak || Spacewatch || — || align=right | 2.7 km || 
|-id=967 bgcolor=#E9E9E9
| 376967 ||  || — || May 11, 2002 || Socorro || LINEAR || — || align=right | 2.7 km || 
|-id=968 bgcolor=#FA8072
| 376968 ||  || — || May 15, 2002 || Socorro || LINEAR || — || align=right | 1.0 km || 
|-id=969 bgcolor=#E9E9E9
| 376969 ||  || — || May 9, 2002 || Socorro || LINEAR || — || align=right | 2.4 km || 
|-id=970 bgcolor=#E9E9E9
| 376970 ||  || — || May 10, 2002 || Palomar || NEAT || — || align=right | 2.2 km || 
|-id=971 bgcolor=#FA8072
| 376971 ||  || — || May 17, 2002 || Socorro || LINEAR || — || align=right data-sort-value="0.87" | 870 m || 
|-id=972 bgcolor=#d6d6d6
| 376972 ||  || — || May 18, 2002 || Palomar || NEAT || — || align=right | 3.5 km || 
|-id=973 bgcolor=#fefefe
| 376973 ||  || — || June 6, 2002 || Socorro || LINEAR || — || align=right | 1.0 km || 
|-id=974 bgcolor=#fefefe
| 376974 ||  || — || July 10, 2002 || Campo Imperatore || CINEOS || FLO || align=right data-sort-value="0.71" | 710 m || 
|-id=975 bgcolor=#d6d6d6
| 376975 ||  || — || June 5, 2002 || Kitt Peak || Spacewatch || JLI || align=right | 3.3 km || 
|-id=976 bgcolor=#fefefe
| 376976 ||  || — || July 4, 2002 || Palomar || NEAT || NYS || align=right data-sort-value="0.63" | 630 m || 
|-id=977 bgcolor=#fefefe
| 376977 ||  || — || July 3, 2002 || Palomar || Palomar Obs. || — || align=right data-sort-value="0.93" | 930 m || 
|-id=978 bgcolor=#fefefe
| 376978 ||  || — || July 4, 2002 || Palomar || NEAT || FLO || align=right data-sort-value="0.66" | 660 m || 
|-id=979 bgcolor=#d6d6d6
| 376979 ||  || — || July 17, 2002 || Socorro || LINEAR || — || align=right | 5.0 km || 
|-id=980 bgcolor=#fefefe
| 376980 ||  || — || July 20, 2002 || Palomar || NEAT || — || align=right data-sort-value="0.89" | 890 m || 
|-id=981 bgcolor=#fefefe
| 376981 ||  || — || July 22, 2002 || Palomar || NEAT || H || align=right data-sort-value="0.57" | 570 m || 
|-id=982 bgcolor=#d6d6d6
| 376982 ||  || — || July 19, 2002 || Palomar || NEAT || — || align=right | 2.8 km || 
|-id=983 bgcolor=#d6d6d6
| 376983 ||  || — || July 18, 2002 || Palomar || NEAT || — || align=right | 2.7 km || 
|-id=984 bgcolor=#fefefe
| 376984 ||  || — || July 17, 2002 || Palomar || NEAT || V || align=right data-sort-value="0.68" | 680 m || 
|-id=985 bgcolor=#d6d6d6
| 376985 ||  || — || July 18, 2002 || Palomar || NEAT || — || align=right | 2.4 km || 
|-id=986 bgcolor=#d6d6d6
| 376986 ||  || — || August 3, 2002 || Palomar || NEAT || — || align=right | 3.5 km || 
|-id=987 bgcolor=#fefefe
| 376987 ||  || — || August 6, 2002 || Palomar || NEAT || FLO || align=right data-sort-value="0.68" | 680 m || 
|-id=988 bgcolor=#fefefe
| 376988 ||  || — || August 6, 2002 || Palomar || NEAT || NYS || align=right data-sort-value="0.53" | 530 m || 
|-id=989 bgcolor=#d6d6d6
| 376989 ||  || — || August 6, 2002 || Campo Imperatore || CINEOS || — || align=right | 3.1 km || 
|-id=990 bgcolor=#fefefe
| 376990 ||  || — || August 10, 2002 || Socorro || LINEAR || — || align=right | 1.3 km || 
|-id=991 bgcolor=#fefefe
| 376991 ||  || — || August 13, 2002 || Anderson Mesa || LONEOS || ERI || align=right | 1.3 km || 
|-id=992 bgcolor=#d6d6d6
| 376992 ||  || — || August 13, 2002 || Anderson Mesa || LONEOS || — || align=right | 3.2 km || 
|-id=993 bgcolor=#d6d6d6
| 376993 ||  || — || August 15, 2002 || Socorro || LINEAR || — || align=right | 2.2 km || 
|-id=994 bgcolor=#fefefe
| 376994 ||  || — || August 14, 2002 || Socorro || LINEAR || — || align=right data-sort-value="0.79" | 790 m || 
|-id=995 bgcolor=#FA8072
| 376995 ||  || — || August 11, 2002 || Socorro || LINEAR || — || align=right | 1.00 km || 
|-id=996 bgcolor=#d6d6d6
| 376996 ||  || — || August 15, 2002 || Palomar || NEAT || — || align=right | 2.9 km || 
|-id=997 bgcolor=#d6d6d6
| 376997 ||  || — || August 15, 2002 || Palomar || NEAT || — || align=right | 2.5 km || 
|-id=998 bgcolor=#d6d6d6
| 376998 ||  || — || August 8, 2002 || Palomar || NEAT || KOR || align=right | 1.5 km || 
|-id=999 bgcolor=#fefefe
| 376999 ||  || — || July 30, 1995 || Kitt Peak || Spacewatch || NYScritical || align=right data-sort-value="0.52" | 520 m || 
|-id=000 bgcolor=#d6d6d6
| 377000 ||  || — || August 29, 2002 || Palomar || NEAT || — || align=right | 2.4 km || 
|}

References

External links 
 Discovery Circumstances: Numbered Minor Planets (375001)–(380000) (IAU Minor Planet Center)

0376